The Germani, German, or Germanic tribes are now considered to be related to the Jastorf culture before expanding and interacting with the other peoples.
The concept of a region for Germanic tribes is traced to the time of Julius Caesar, a Roman general and statesman who first referred to the unconquered area east of the Rhine river as "Germania" and the tribes who lived at there as "Germani". In 9, the victory of the Germanic tribes in the Battle of the Teutoburg Forest prevented annexation of Germania by the Roman Empire. Following the fall of Rome made by the Germanic tribes in 476 with their invasions in the context of the Migration Period and the founding of their own kingdoms; the Franks, a West Germanic tribe, later conquered the other West Germanic tribes and established the Frankish Empire (Francia). When the Frankish Empire was divided among Charles the Great's heirs in 843, the eastern part became East Francia; which marked the final end of Germanic period and the foundation of the Kingdom of Germany as well, especially when the Ottonian dynasty having origin from the Duchy of Saxony of the Germanic Saxons started to rule the kingdom in 919. In 962, King Otto I of East Francia became the first Holy Roman Emperor of the Holy Roman Empire.

The period of the Early Middle Ages and High Middle Ages with the Frankish Empire, East Francia, and the Holy Roman Empire as a great power in Europe saw the christianization of the German people; developments of the German-speaking region; the ethnic Germans i.e. the Germanic (speaking) peoples beginning to move to settle in the East, including present-day Eastern Germany; and expansion of German territory with the various free states. The first was the establishment of the trading conglomerate known as the Hanseatic League, which was dominated by a number of German port cities along the Baltic and North Sea coasts. The second was the growth of a crusading element within German Christendom. This led to the establishment of the State of the Teutonic Order, established along the Baltic coast of what is today Estonia, Latvia, and Lithuania. This crusader state led to the Christianization of these regions, as well as an extension of Germanic culture and language eastward. Also during this period, German Emperors became embroiled in conflicts with the Catholic Church over various political issues, resulting in the Investiture Controversy. In future, the State of the Teutonic Order would become the Duchy of Prussia then the Kingdom of Prussia.

In the Late Middle Ages, the regional dukes, princes, and bishops gained power at the expense of the emperors. Martin Luther led the Protestant Reformation within the Catholic Church after 1517, as the northern and eastern states became Protestant, while most of the southern and western states remained Catholic. The two parts of the Holy Roman Empire clashed in the Thirty Years' War (1618–1648), which was ruinous to the twenty million civilians living in both parts. The Thirty Years' War brought tremendous destruction to Germany; more than 1/4 of the population in the German states were killed by the catastrophic war. The estates of the Holy Roman Empire attained a high extent of autonomy in the Peace of Westphalia, some of them being capable of their own foreign policies or controlling land outside of the Empire, the most important being Austria, Prussia, Bavaria, and Saxony. With the French Revolution and the Napoleonic Wars from 1803 to 1815, feudalism fell away by reforms and the dissolution of the Austrian-led Holy Roman Empire. Napoleon instead established the Confederation of the Rhine as his German puppet state. After the French defeat, the German Confederation was established under Austrian presidency and included all German states and German-speaking lands. Thereafter liberalism and nationalism clashed with reaction. The German revolutions of 1848–49 failed. The Industrial Revolution modernized the German economy, led to the rapid growth of cities and the emergence of the socialist movement in Germany. Prussia, rival of Austria, with its capital Berlin, grew in power. German universities became world-class centers for science and humanities, while music and art flourished. Prussia beat Austria and dissolved German Confederation to establish the North German Confederation led by Prussia in 1866. The unification of Germany (excluding Austria) was achieved under the leadership of Chancellor Otto von Bismarck with the formation of the German Empire led by Prussia when most of German states in the South joined the North German Confederation after German victory over France in 1871. This resulted in the Kleindeutsche Lösung supported by Prussia, ("small Germany solution", Germany without Austria), rather than the Großdeutsche Lösung supported by Austria, ("greater Germany solution", Germany with Austria); which means new Germany did not include Austria and its non-German speaking lands. In 1879, Germany and Austria (Austria-Hungary) became military allies, alliance of the two countries was later called the "Central Powers"; Italy, Ottoman, and Bulgaria later joined it but then Italy withdrew because of the territorial disputing with Austria. The new Reichstag, an elected parliament, had only a limited role in the imperial government. Germany joined the other powers in colonial expansion in Africa and the Pacific. Under Emperor Wilhelm II after Bismarck retired in 1890, Germany's foreign relations with Britain-France-Russia deteriorated due to Germany's ambition increasing to challenge other 3 powers.

Right before German engagement in World War I on 1 August 1914; Germany was one of the greatest powers in the world with the strongest armed forces, strong economy and first modern welfare system and big influence in all fields, as well as the dominant power on the European continent, its GDP as well as rapidly expanding industry had surpassed Britain's while provoking it in one naval arms race. Result of fact that Austria-Hungary declared war on Serbia was World War I; Germany as a member of the Central Powers joined this worldwide conflict (1914–1918) against the Allied Powers. The Central Powers beat Russia in east, initially advanced then held out in west; Germany lost on 11 November 1918 as fighting in two fronts then keeping considerable amount of army in east while the allies of Germany were disproportionately effective and facing consequence of United States accession. After the war (Armistice of 11 November 1918); Germany was humiliated, partly occupied for a time, forced to pay big war reparations, and stripped of its colonies as well as significant territory along its borders by the 1919 Treaty of Versailles in the Paris "Peace" Conference. The German Revolution of 1918–19 put an end to the German Empire with the abdication of Wilhelm II on 9 November 1918 and established the Weimar Republic, an ultimately unstable parliamentary democracy. On 23 March 1933, Adolf Hitler-led Nazi Party, used the weak democracy and the economic hardships of the worldwide Great Depression from United States after German Golden Twenties along with popular resentment over the terms imposed on Germany after World War I to establish his totalitarian regime which was also called Nazi Germany. This regime made the extreme racism, especially antisemitism, a central tenet of its policies, and became increasingly aggressive with its territorial demands, threatening war if they were not met. Germany also quickly remilitarized to build its strong armed forces and did a socio-economic growth, then annexed Austria and the German-speaking areas of Czechoslovakia both in 1938. 1 September 1939, after taking rest of Czechoslovakia, the country launched  invasion of Poland, which quickly grew into World War II with Germany being a member of Axis which included the Empire of Japan. Nazi de jure final goal was Soviet east land to end Soviet state and create its totalitarian-racist "Greater Germanic Reich" in most Europe, for Germanic speaking peoples; with Nazi satellite polities near it and Britain a Germanic speaking country being the exception as its plan was being a Britain's ally, as well as with new world order under main Axis powers and Nazi Germany rising the leader although Nazi Germany's de facto final goal could be the establishment a state of its for the whole world after. During the war, the Nazi regime established a systematic genocide program known as the Holocaust which killed 17 million people, including 6 million Jews (representing 2/3rd of the European Jewish population of 1933). Although Germany had military successes in North Africa and most Europe against British Empire and its allies, beside Japanese successes; Germany lost due to fighting in two fronts and successive defeats to the Soviet Union in east from Battle of Stalingrad as well as consequence of fact that the United States entered the war while the allies of Germany were also disproportionately effective. Following the Allied invasion of Normandy in France in June 1944, the German armed forces was pushed back on all fronts by the Allies until final collapse on 8 May 1945. Europe was devastated, Anglo-France were declined, and United States-Soviet Union became only the two superpowers in the world. World War II weakened the ruling colonies, most ruled by the Allies. From 5 June 1945, under occupation by the four Allies after the end of World War II in Europe leading to fall of the Nazi regime; Nazi territorial annexations were completely annulled, denazification efforts took place, Germany lost its eastern territories and Germans in Eastern Europe fled and were expelled, German territories were split up by the victorious powers. With the rise of the geo-political conflict of the Allies after the war, including the fact that the Soviets withdrew from the Allied Control Council (ACC) ruling entire Germany on 23 March 1948; their plan about founding a new single German state failed at the time. After Allied occupation of entire Germany, on 23 May 1949, the Federal Republic of Germany i.e. West Germany was founded in the US-UK-French zones. On 7 October 1949; with the official founding of the German Democratic Republic i.e. East Germany in Soviet zone, the 2 German countries also appeared since the time. Germans also fled from East Germany into West Germany (including West Berlin), which experienced rapid economic expansion, and became a socio-economic superpower. 

The international Revolutions of 1989, against communist states including the Soviet Union as well as supporting liberal democracy; happened in East Germany. In 1989, the Berlin Wall preventing free movement between West Berlin and East Berlin was opened and the Eastern Bloc collapsed. The four Allies recognized full sovereignty of a reunited Germany. East Germany joined West Germany, forming present-day Germany on 3 October 1990. The Franco-German friendship between Germany and France becomes one important basis for the integration of Europe in general and the European Union (EU) in particular where Germany is one very positive member. In 1998–1999, Germany was one of the founding countries of the eurozone. Germany remains one of the economic powerhouses of Europe, contributing about 1/4 of the eurozone's annual gross domestic product. In general, Germany is a great power in the world. In the early 2010s, Germany played a critical role in trying to resolve the escalating euro crisis, especially concerning Greece and other Southern European nations. In 2015, Germany faced the European migrant crisis as the main receiver of asylum seekers from Syria and other troubled regions, leading to Germany's reception of a significant number of refugees who wanted to immigrate to Germany. With the 2022 Russian invasion of Ukraine; Germany chose to join in solidarity with the EU members and other allies to make decisions against Russia and supporting Ukraine further, Germany also decided to further strengthen its armed forces.

Prehistory

Pre-human ancestors, who were present in Germany over 11 million years ago, are theorized to be among the earliest ones to walk on two legs. The discovery of the Homo heidelbergensis mandible in 1907 affirms archaic human presence in Germany by at least 600,000 years ago. The oldest complete set of hunting weapons ever found anywhere in the world was excavated from a coal mine in Schöningen, Lower Saxony.

In 1856, the fossilized bones of an extinct human species were salvaged from a limestone grotto in the Neander valley near Düsseldorf, North Rhine-Westphalia. The archaic nature of the fossils, now known to be around 40,000 years old, was recognized and the characteristics published in the first-ever paleoanthropologic species description in 1858 by Hermann Schaaffhausen. The species was named Homo neanderthalensis – Neanderthal man in 1864.

The remains of Paleolithic early modern human occupation uncovered and documented in several caves in the Swabian Jura include various mammoth ivory sculptures that rank among the oldest uncontested works of art and several flutes, made of bird bone and mammoth ivory that are confirmed to be the oldest musical instruments ever found. The 40,000-year-old Löwenmensch figurine represents the oldest uncontested figurative work of art and the 35,000-year-old Venus of Hohle Fels has been asserted as the oldest uncontested object of human figurative art ever discovered. These artefacts are attributed to the Aurignacian culture.

Between 12,900 and 11,700 years ago, north-central Germany was part of the Ahrensburg culture (named for Ahrensburg).

The first groups of early farmers different from the indigenous hunter-gatherers to migrate into Europe came from a population in western Anatolia at the beginning of the Neolithic period between 10,000 and 8,000 years ago.

Central Germany was one of the primary areas of the Linear Pottery culture (c. 5500 BC to 4500 BC), which was partially contemporary with the Ertebølle culture (c. 5300 BC to 3950 BC) of Denmark and northern Germany. The construction of the Central European Neolithic circular enclosures falls in this time period with the best known and oldest being the Goseck circle, constructed c. 4900 BC. Afterwards, northeastern Germany, along with great parts of Poland and Denmark, was part of the Funnelbeaker culture (c. 4300 BC to 2800 BC). The oldest traces for the use of wheel and wagon ever found are located at a northern German site and date to around 3400 BC. 

The settlers of the Corded Ware culture (c. 2900 BC to 2350 BC), that had spread all over the fertile plains of Central Europe during the Late Neolithic were of Indo-European ancestry. The Indo-Europeans had, via mass-migration, arrived into the heartland of Europe around 4,500 years ago.

By the late Bronze Age, the Urnfield culture (c. 1300 BC to 750 BC) had replaced the Bell Beaker, Unetice and Tumulus cultures in central Europe, whilst the Nordic Bronze Age had developed in Scandinavia and northern Germany. The Hallstatt culture, which had developed from the Urnfield culture, was the predominant Western and Central European culture from the 12th to 8th centuries BC and during the early Iron Age (8th to 6th centuries BC). It was followed by the La Tène culture (5th to 1st centuries BC). 

The people who had adopted these cultural characteristics are regarded as Celts. How and if the Celts are related to the Urnfield culture remains disputed. However, Celtic cultural centres developed in central Europe during the late Bronze Age (circa 1200 BC until 700 BC). Some, like the Heuneburg, the oldest city north of the Alps, grew to become important cultural centres of the Iron Age in Central Europe, that maintained trade routes to the Mediterranean. In the 5th century BC the Greek historian Herodotus mentioned a Celtic city at the Danube – Pyrene, that historians attribute to the Heuneburg. Beginning around 700 BC (or later), Germanic peoples (Germanic tribes) from southern Scandinavia and northern Germany expanded south and gradually replaced the Celtic peoples in Central Europe.

Early history: Germanic tribes, Roman conquests, and the Migration Period

Early migrations, the Suebi and the Roman Republic

The ethnogenesis of the Germanic tribes remains debated. However, for author Averil Cameron "it is obvious that a steady process" occurred during the Nordic Bronze Age, or at the latest during the Pre-Roman Iron Age (Jastorf culture). From their homes in southern Scandinavia and northern Germany the tribes began expanding south, east and west during the 1st century BC, and came into contact with the Celtic tribes of Gaul, as well as with Iranic, Baltic, and Slavic cultures in Central/Eastern Europe.

Factual and detailed knowledge about the early history of the Germanic tribes is rare. Researchers have to be content with the recordings of the tribes' affairs with the Romans, linguistic conclusions, archaeological discoveries and the rather new yet auspicious results of archaeogenetic study. In the mid-1st century BC, Republican Roman statesman Julius Caesar erected the first known bridges across the Rhine during his campaign in Gaul and led a military contingent across and into the territories of the local Germanic tribes. After several days and having made no contact with Germanic troops (who had retreated inland) Caesar returned to the west of the river. By 60 BC, the Suebi tribe under chieftain Ariovistus, had conquered lands of the Gallic Aedui tribe to the west of the Rhine. Consequent plans to populate the region with Germanic settlers from the east were vehemently opposed by Caesar, who had already launched his ambitious campaign to subjugate all Gaul. Julius Caesar defeated the Suebi forces in 58 BC in the Battle of Vosges and forced Ariovistus to retreat across the Rhine.

Roman settlement of the Rhine

Augustus, first emperor of the Roman Empire, considered conquest beyond the Rhine and the Danube not only regular foreign policy but also necessary to counter Germanic incursions into a still rebellious Gaul. A series of forts and commercial centers were established along the two rivers. Some tribes, such as the Ubii consequently allied with Rome and readily adopted advanced Roman culture. During the 1st century CE Roman legions conducted extended campaigns into Germania magna, the area north of the Upper Danube and east of the Rhine, attempting to subdue the various tribes. Roman ideas of administration, the imposition of taxes and a legal framework were frustrated by the total absence of an infrastructure. The campaigns of Germanicus, for example were almost exclusively characterized by frequent massacres of villagers and indiscriminate pillaging. The tribes, however maintained their elusive identities. In 9 AD a coalition of tribes under the Cherusci chieftain Arminius, who was familiar with Roman tactical doctrines, defeated a sizeable Roman force in the Battle of the Teutoburg Forest. Consequently, Rome resolved to permanently establish the Rhine/Danube border and refrain from further territorial advance into Germania. By AD 100 the frontier along the Rhine and the Danube and the Limes Germanicus was firmly established. Several Germanic tribes lived under Roman rule south and west of the border, as described in Tacitus's Germania. These lands represent the modern states Baden-Württemberg, southern Bavaria, southern Hesse, Saarland and the Rhineland. Austria formed the regular provinces of Noricum and Raetia. The provinces Germania Inferior (with the capital situated at Colonia Claudia Ara Agrippinensium, modern Cologne) and Germania Superior (with its capital at Mogontiacum, modern Mainz), were formally established in 85 AD, after long and painful campaigns as lasting military control was confined to the lands surrounding the rivers. Christianity was introduced to Roman controlled western Germania well before the Middle Ages, with Christian religious structures such as the Aula Palatina of Trier built during the reign of Constantine I (r. 306–337 AD).

Migration Period and decline of the Western Roman Empire 

Rome's Third Century Crisis coincided with the emergence of a number of large West Germanic tribes: the Alamanni, Franks, Bavarii, Chatti, Saxons, Frisii, Sicambri, and Thuringii. By the 3rd century the Germanic speaking peoples began to migrate beyond the limes and the Danube frontier. Several large tribes – the Visigoths, Ostrogoths, Vandals, Burgundians, Lombards, Saxons and Franks – migrated and played their part in the decline of the Roman Empire and the transformation of the old Western Roman Empire. By the end of the 4th century the Huns invaded eastern and central Europe, establishing the Hunnic Empire. The event triggered the Migration Period. Hunnic hegemony over a vast territory in central and eastern Europe lasted until the death of Attila's son Dengizich in 469. Another pivotal moment in the Migration Period was the Crossing of the Rhine in December of 406 by a large group of tribes including Vandals, Alans and Suebi who settled permanently within the crumbling Western Roman Empire.

Stem duchies and marches 

Stem duchies in Germany refer to the traditional territory of the various Germanic tribes. The concept of such duchies survived especially in the areas which by the 9th century would constitute East Francia, which included the Duchy of Bavaria, the Duchy of Swabia, the Duchy of Saxony, the Duchy of Franconia and the Duchy of Thuringia, unlike further west the County of Burgundy or Lorraine in Middle Francia.

The Salian emperors (reigned 1027–1125) retained the stem duchies as the major divisions of Germany, but they became increasingly obsolete during the early high-medieval period under the Hohenstaufen, and Frederick Barbarossa finally abolished them in 1180 in favour of more numerous territorial duchies.

Successive kings of Germany founded a series of border counties or marches in the east and the north. These included Lusatia, the North March (which would become Brandenburg and the heart of the future Prussia), and the Billung March. In the south, the marches included Carniola, Styria, and the March of Austria that would become Austria.

Middle Ages

Frankish Empire

The Western Roman Empire fell in 476 with the deposition of Romulus Augustus by the Germanic foederati leader Odoacer, who became the first King of Italy. Afterwards, the Franks, like other post-Roman Western Europeans, emerged as a tribal confederacy in the Middle Rhine-Weser region, among the territory soon to be called Austrasia (the "eastern land"), the northeastern portion of the future Kingdom of the Merovingian Franks. As a whole, Austrasia comprised parts of present-day France, Germany, Belgium, Luxembourg and the Netherlands. Unlike the Alamanni to their south in Swabia, they absorbed large swaths of former Roman territory as they spread west into Gaul, beginning in 250. Clovis I of the Merovingian dynasty conquered northern Gaul in 486 and in the Battle of Tolbiac in 496 the Alemanni tribe in Swabia, which eventually became the Duchy of Swabia.

By 500, Clovis had united all the Frankish tribes, ruled all of Gaul and was proclaimed King of the Franks between 509 and 511. Clovis, unlike most Germanic rulers of the time, was baptized directly into Roman Catholicism instead of Arianism. His successors would cooperate closely with papal missionaries, among them Saint Boniface. After the death of Clovis in 511, his four sons partitioned his kingdom including Austrasia. Authority over Austrasia passed back and forth from autonomy to royal subjugation, as successive Merovingian kings alternately united and subdivided the Frankish lands.

During the 5th and 6th centuries the Merovingian kings conquered the Thuringii (531 to 532), the Kingdom of the Burgundians and the principality of Metz and defeated the Danes, the Saxons and the Visigoths. King Chlothar I (558 to 561) ruled the greater part of what is now Germany and undertook military expeditions into Saxony, while the South-east of what is modern Germany remained under the influence of the Ostrogoths. Saxons controlled the area from the northern sea board to the Harz Mountains and the Eichsfeld in the south.

The Merovingians placed the various regions of their Frankish Empire under the control of semi-autonomous dukes – either Franks or local rulers, and followed imperial Roman strategic traditions of social and political integration of the newly conquered territories. While allowed to preserve their own legal systems, the conquered Germanic tribes were pressured to abandon the Arian Christian faith.

In 718 Charles Martel waged war against the Saxons in support of the Neustrians. In 743 his son Carloman in his role as Mayor of the Palace renewed the war against the Saxons, who had allied with and aided the duke Odilo of Bavaria. The Catholic Franks, who by 750 controlled a vast territory in Gaul, north-western Germany, Swabia, Burgundy and western Switzerland, that included the alpine passes allied with the Curia in Rome against the Lombards, who posed a permanent threat to the Holy See. Pressed by Liutprand, King of the Lombards, a Papal envoy for help had already been sent to the de facto ruler Charles Martel after his victory in 732 over the forces of the Umayyad Caliphate at the Battle of Tours, however a lasting and mutually beneficial alliance would only materialize after Charles' death under his successor Duke of the Franks, Pepin the Short.

In 751 Pippin III, Mayor of the Palace under the Merovingian king, himself assumed the title of king and was anointed by the Church. Pope Stephen II bestowed him the hereditary title of Patricius Romanorum as protector of Rome and St. Peter in response to the Donation of Pepin, that guaranteed the sovereignty of the Papal States. Charles the Great (who ruled the Franks from 774 to 814) launched a decades-long military campaign against the Franks' heathen rivals, the Saxons and the Avars. The campaigns and insurrections of the Saxon Wars lasted from 772 to 804. The Franks eventually overwhelmed the Saxons and Avars, forcibly converted the people to Christianity, and annexed their lands to the Carolingian Empire.

Foundation of the Holy Roman Empire

After the death of Frankish king Pepin the Short in 768, his oldest son "Charlemagne" ("Charles the Great") consolidated his power over and expanded the Kingdom. Charlemagne ended 200 years of Royal Lombard rule with the Siege of Pavia, and in 774 he installed himself as King of the Lombards. Loyal Frankish nobles replaced the old Lombard aristocracy following a rebellion in 776. The next 30 years of his reign were spent ruthlessly strengthening his power in Francia and on the conquest of the Slavs and Pannonian Avars in the east and all tribes, such as the Saxons and the Bavarians. On Christmas Day, 800 AD, Charlemagne was crowned Imperator Romanorum (Emperor of the Romans) in Rome by Pope Leo III.

Fighting among Charlemagne's three grandsons over the continuation of the custom of partible inheritance or the introduction of primogeniture caused the Carolingian empire to be partitioned into three parts by the Treaty of Verdun of 843. Louis the German received the Eastern portion of the kingdom, East Francia, all lands east of the Rhine river and to the north of Italy. This encompassed the territories of the German stem duchies – Franks, Saxons, Swabians, and Bavarians – that were united in a federation under the first non-Frankish king Henry the Fowler, who ruled from 919 to 936. The royal court permanently moved in between a series of strongholds, called Kaiserpfalzen, that developed into economic and cultural centers. Aachen Palace played a central role, as the local Palatine Chapel served as the official site for all royal coronation ceremonies during the entire Medieval period until 1531.

Otto the Great

In 936, Otto I was crowned German king at Aachen, in 961 King of Italy in Pavia and crowned emperor by Pope John XII in Rome in 962. The tradition of the German King as protector of the Kingdom of Italy and the Latin Church resulted in the term Holy Roman Empire in the 12th century. The name, that was to identify with Germany continued to be used officially, with the extension added: Nationis Germanicæ (of the German nation) after the last imperial coronation in Rome in 1452 until its dissolution in 1806. Otto strengthened the royal authority by re-asserting the old Carolingian rights over ecclesiastical appointments. Otto wrested from the nobles the powers of appointment of the bishops and abbots, who controlled large land holdings. Additionally, Otto revived the old Carolingian program of appointing missionaries in the border lands. Otto continued to support celibacy for the higher clergy, so ecclesiastical appointments never became hereditary. By granting lands to the abbots and bishops he appointed, Otto actually turned these bishops into "princes of the Empire" (Reichsfürsten). In this way, Otto was able to establish a national church. Outside threats to the kingdom were contained with the decisive defeat of the Hungarian Magyars at the Battle of Lechfeld in 955. The Slavs between the Elbe and the Oder rivers were also subjugated. Otto marched on Rome and drove John XII from the papal throne and for years controlled the election of the pope, setting a firm precedent for imperial control of the papacy for years to come.

During the reign of Conrad II's son, Henry III (1039 to 1056), the empire supported the Cluniac reforms of the Church, the Peace of God, prohibition of simony (the purchase of clerical offices), and required celibacy of priests. Imperial authority over the Pope reached its peak. However, Rome reacted with the creation of the College of Cardinals and Pope Gregory VII's series of clerical reforms. Pope Gregory insisted in his Dictatus Papae on absolute papal authority over appointments to ecclesiastical offices. The subsequent conflict in which emperor Henry IV was compelled to submit to the Pope at Canossa in 1077, after having been excommunicated came to be known as the Investiture Controversy. In 1122, a temporary reconciliation was reached between Henry V and the Pope with the Concordat of Worms. With the conclusion of the dispute the Roman church and the papacy regained supreme control over all religious affairs. Consequently, the imperial Ottonian church system (Reichskirche) declined. It also ended the royal/imperial tradition of appointing selected powerful clerical leaders to counter the Imperial secular princes.

Between 1095 and 1291 the various campaigns of the crusades to the Holy Land took place. Knightly religious orders were established, including the Knights Templar, the Knights of St John (Knights Hospitaller), and the Teutonic Order.

The term sacrum imperium (Holy Empire) was first used officially by Friedrich I in 1157, but the words Sacrum Romanum Imperium, Holy Roman Empire, were only combined in July 1180 and would never consistently appear on official documents from 1254 onwards.

Hanseatic League

The Hanseatic League was a commercial and defensive alliance of the merchant guilds of towns and cities in northern and central Europe that dominated marine trade in the Baltic Sea, the North Sea and along the connected navigable rivers during the Late Middle Ages ( 12th to 15th centuries ). Each of the affiliated cities retained the legal system of its sovereign and, with the exception of the Free imperial cities, had only a limited degree of political autonomy. Beginning with an agreement of the cities of Lübeck and Hamburg, guilds cooperated in order to strengthen and combine their economic assets, like securing trading routes and tax privileges, to control prices and better protect and market their local commodities. Important centers of commerce within the empire, such as Cologne on the Rhine river and Bremen on the North Sea joined the union, which resulted in greater diplomatic esteem. Recognized by the various regional princes for the great economic potential, favorable charters for, often exclusive, commercial operations were granted. During its zenith the alliance maintained trading posts and kontors in virtually all cities between London and Edinburgh in the west to Novgorod in the east and Bergen in Norway. By the late 14th century the powerful league enforced its interests with military means, if necessary. This culminated in a war with the sovereign Kingdom of Denmark from 1361 to 1370. Principal city of the Hanseatic League remained Lübeck, where in 1356 the first general diet was held and its official structure was announced. The league declined after 1450 due to a number of factors, such as the 15th-century crisis, the territorial lords' shifting policies towards greater commercial control, the silver crisis and marginalization in the wider Eurasian trade network, among others.

Eastward expansion

The Ostsiedlung (lit. Eastern settlement) is the term for a process of largely uncoordinated immigration and chartering of settlement structures by ethnic Germans into territories, already inhabited by Slavs and Balts east of the Saale and Elbe rivers, such as modern Poland and Silesia and to the south into Bohemia, modern Hungary and Romania during the High Middle Ages from the 11th to the 14th century. The primary purpose of the early imperial military campaigns into the lands to the east during the 10th and 11th century, was to punish and subjugate the local heathen tribes. Conquered territories were mostly lost after the troops had retreated, but eventually were incorporated into the empire as marches, fortified borderlands with garrisoned troops in strongholds and castles, who were to ensure military control and enforce the exaction of tributes. Contemporary sources do not support the idea of policies or plans for the organized settlement of civilians.

Emperor Lothair II re-established feudal sovereignty over Poland, Denmark and Bohemia from 1135 and appointed margraves to turn the borderlands into hereditary fiefs and install a civilian administration. There is no discernible chronology of the immigration process as it took place in many individual efforts and stages, often even encouraged by the Slavic regional lords. However, the new communities were subjected to German law and customs. Total numbers of settlers were generally rather low and, depending on who held a numerical majority, populations usually assimilated into each other. In many regions only enclaves would persist, like Hermannstadt, founded by the Transylvanian Saxons in the medieval Hungarian Kingdom(today in Romania) who called on by Geza II. in 1147[Saxons called those part of Transylvania as "Altland" to distinguish it from later immigrant Saxon settlements what established about 1220 by Teutonic Order]

In 1230, the Catholic monastic order of the Teutonic Knights launched the Prussian Crusade. The campaign, that was supported by the forces of Polish duke Konrad I of Masovia, initially intended to Christianize the Baltic Old Prussians, succeeded primarily in the conquest of large territories. The order, emboldened by imperial approval, quickly resolved to establish an independent state, without the consent of duke Konrad. Recognizing only papal authority and based on a solid economy, the order steadily expanded the Teutonic state during the following 150 years, engaging in several land disputes with its neighbors. Permanent conflicts with the Kingdom of Poland, the Grand Duchy of Lithuania, and the Novgorod Republic, eventually led to military defeat and containment by the mid-15th century. The last Grand Master Albert of Brandenburg converted to Lutheranism in 1525 and turned the remaining lands of the order into the secular Duchy of Prussia.

Church and state

Henry V (1086–1125), great-grandson of Conrad II, who had overthrown his father Henry IV became Holy Roman Emperor in 1111. Hoping to gain greater control over the church inside the Empire, Henry V appointed Adalbert of Saarbrücken as the powerful archbishop of Mainz in the same year. Adalbert began to assert the powers of the Church against secular authorities, that is, the Emperor. This precipitated the "Crisis of 1111" as yet another chapter of the long-term Investiture Controversy. In 1137, the prince-electors turned back to the Hohenstaufen family for a candidate, Conrad III. Conrad tried to divest his rival Henry the Proud of his two duchies—Bavaria and Saxony—that led to war in southern Germany as the empire was divided into two powerful factions. The faction of the Welfs or Guelphs (in Italian) supported the House of Welf of Henry the Proud, which was the ruling dynasty in the Duchy of Bavaria. The rival faction of the Waiblings or Ghibellines (in Italian) pledged allegiance to the Swabian House of Hohenstaufen. During this early period, the Welfs generally maintained ecclesiastical independence under the papacy and political particularism (the focus on ducal interests against the central imperial authority). The Waiblings, on the other hand, championed strict control of the church and a strong central imperial government.

During the reign of the Hohenstaufen emperor Frederick I (Barbarossa), an accommodation was reached in 1156 between the two factions. The Duchy of Bavaria was returned to Henry the Proud's son Henry the Lion, duke of Saxony, who represented the Guelph party. However, the Margraviate of Austria was separated from Bavaria and turned into the independent Duchy of Austria by virtue of the Privilegium Minus in 1156.

Having become wealthy through trade, the confident cities of Northern Italy, supported by the Pope, increasingly opposed Barbarossa's claim of feudal rule (Honor Imperii) over Italy. The cities united in the Lombard League and finally defeated Barbarossa in the Battle of Legnano in 1176. The following year a reconciliation was reached between the emperor and Pope Alexander III in the Treaty of Venice. The 1183 Peace of Constance eventually settled that the Italian cities remained loyal to the empire but were granted local jurisdiction and full regal rights in their territories.

In 1180, Henry the Lion was outlawed, Saxony was divided, and Bavaria was given to Otto of Wittelsbach, who founded the Wittelsbach dynasty, which was to rule Bavaria until 1918.

From 1184 to 1186, the empire under Frederick I Barbarossa reached its cultural peak with the Diet of Pentecost held at Mainz and the marriage of his son Henry in Milan to the Norman princess Constance of Sicily. The power of the feudal lords was undermined by the appointment of ministerials (unfree servants of the Emperor) as officials. Chivalry and the court life flowered, as expressed in the scholastic philosophy of Albertus Magnus and the literature of Wolfram von Eschenbach.

Between 1212 and 1250, Frederick II established a modern, professionally administered state from his base in Sicily. He resumed the conquest of Italy, leading to further conflict with the Papacy. In the Empire, extensive sovereign powers were granted to ecclesiastical and secular princes, leading to the rise of independent territorial states. The struggle with the Pope sapped the Empire's strength, as Frederick II was excommunicated three times. After his death, the Hohenstaufen dynasty fell, followed by an interregnum during which there was no Emperor (1250–1273). This interregnum came to an end with the election of a small Swabian count, Rudolf of Habsburg, as emperor.

The failure of negotiations between Emperor Louis IV and the papacy led to the 1338 Declaration at Rhense by six princes of the Imperial Estate to the effect that election by all or the majority of the electors automatically conferred the royal title and rule over the empire, without papal confirmation. As result, the monarch was no longer subject to papal approbation and became increasingly dependent on the favour of the electors. Between 1346 and 1378 Emperor Charles IV of Luxembourg, king of Bohemia, sought to restore imperial authority. The 1356 decree of the Golden Bull stipulated that all future emperors were to be chosen by a college of only seven – four secular and three clerical – electors. The secular electors were the King of Bohemia, the Count Palatine of the Rhine, the Duke of Saxony, and the Margrave of Brandenburg, the clerical electors were the Archbishops of Mainz, Trier, and Cologne.

Between 1347 and 1351 Germany and almost the entire European continent were consumed by the most severe outbreak of the Black Death pandemic. Estimated to have caused the abrupt death of 30 to 60% of Europe's population, it led to widespread social and economic disruption and deep religious disaffection and fanaticism. Minority groups, and Jews in particular were blamed, singled out and attacked. As a consequence, many Jews fled and resettled in Eastern Europe.

Towns and cities

Total population estimates of the German territories range around 5 to 6 million by the end of Henry III's reign in 1056 and about 7 to 8 million after Friedrich Barabarossa's rule in 1190. The vast majority were farmers, typically in a state of serfdom under feudal lords and monasteries. Towns gradually emerged and in the 12th century many new cities were founded along the trading routes and near imperial strongholds and castles. The towns were subjected to the municipal legal system. Cities such as Cologne, that had acquired the status of Imperial Free Cities, were no longer answerable to the local landlords or bishops, but immediate subjects of the Emperor and enjoyed greater commercial and legal liberties. The towns were ruled by a council of the – usually mercantile – elite, the patricians. Craftsmen formed guilds, governed by strict rules, which sought to obtain control of the towns; a few were open to women. Society had diversified, but was divided into sharply demarcated classes of the clergy, physicians, merchants, various guilds of artisans, unskilled day labourers and peasants. Full citizenship was not available to paupers. Political tensions arose from issues of taxation, public spending, regulation of business, and market supervision, as well as the limits of corporate autonomy.

Cologne's central location on the Rhine river placed it at the intersection of the major trade routes between east and west and was the basis of Cologne's growth. The economic structures of medieval and early modern Cologne were characterized by the city's status as a major harbor and transport hub upon the Rhine. It was the seat of an archbishop, under whose patronage the vast Cologne Cathedral was built since 1240. The cathedral houses sacred Christian relics and it has since become a well known pilgrimage destination. By 1288 the city had secured its independence from the archbishop (who relocated to Bonn), and was ruled by its burghers.

Women

The status of women varied, depending on the region and the period. The Ottonian queens and empresses (including Matilda of Ringelheim, Adelaide of Italy, Theophanu, Cunigunde of Luxembourg were among the most powerful women of the entire Middle Age. Abbesses, especially those of Imperial abbeys wielded tremendous power, with influence encompassing spiritual, economic, political and intellectual realms.

Hrotsvitha, Gerberga II of Gandersheim, Ava, Hildegard of Bingen, Elisabeth of Schönau, Herrad of Landsberg, Mechthild of Magdeburg,  Mechthild of Hackeborn, Gertrude the Great, and Argula von Grumbach were among the most accomplished female writers of the entire Middle Age.  They pursued fields as diverse as medicine, music composition, religious writing, and government and military politics, with the prime example being the polymath Hildegard von Bingen, who has been praised as "the greatest mystic ever" and one of "the greatest intellectuals of the West". Through sources like the Annals of Quedlinburg (the chief source on Ottonian history, presided over by the abbess Adelheid and likely written by female scribes), female intellectuals left their accounts of German and European history. Ava, the first German poetess, was also the author of the first German epic and the first woman to write in a European vernacular. Hrosvitha was the first Medieval Latin dramatist.

Salic (Frankish) law, which was applied in many regions, placed women at a disadvantage with regard to property and inheritance rights. Germanic widows required a male guardian to represent them in court. Unlike Anglo-Saxon law or the Visigothic Code, Salic law barred women and descendants from (only) female lines from royal succession.

The imperial dignity was elective. In the beginning, imperial succession was not strictly regulated. In the case of Empress Theophanu, it was expected that she would have become emperor had Otto II had no sons. In many cases, the imperial throne came to descendants from a female line, such as the Salians who were descendants of Otto the Great through the female line; Frederick Barbarossa who descended from the Salian through his grandmother Agnes of Waiblingen and had connection with the Hohenstaufen's powerful rival family, the Welfs, through his mother Judith of Welf; Albert II, who was the son-in-law and heir of Emperor Sigismund, the last male Luxembourg through his marriage with Elizabeth of Luxembourg.

When the imperial throne became practically hereditary under the Habsburg, the effort to make the princess Maria Theresa his heir by Emperor Charles VI met with many difficulties. While most European governments recognized his Pragmatic Sanction (that would allow female right of succeeding), in practice, Maria Theresa's inheritance was still contested. In the end, she gained the Hungarian, Bohemia and Austrian thrones while the elective imperial office went to her husband Francis.

According to Sagarra, social status was based on military and biological roles, a reality demonstrated in rituals associated with newborns, when female infants were given a lesser value than male infants. The use of physical force against wives was condoned until the 18th century in Bavarian law.

Learning and culture

Benedictine abbess Hildegard von Bingen (1098–1179) wrote several influential theological, botanical, and medicinal texts, as well as letters, liturgical songs, poems, and arguably the oldest surviving morality play, Ordo Virtutum, while supervising brilliant miniature Illuminations. About 100 years later, Walther von der Vogelweide (c. 1170 – c. 1230) became the most celebrated of the Minnesänger, who were Middle High German lyric poets.

Around 1439, Johannes Gutenberg of Mainz, used movable type printing and issued the Gutenberg Bible. He was the global inventor of the printing press, thereby starting the Printing Revolution.  Cheap printed books and pamphlets played central roles for the spread of the Reformation and the Scientific Revolution.

Around the transition from the 15th to the 16th century, Albrecht Dürer from Nuremberg established his reputation across Europe as painter, printmaker, mathematician, engraver, and theorist when he was still in his twenties and secured his reputation as one of the most important figures of the Northern Renaissance.

Early modern Germany

See List of states in the Holy Roman Empire for subdivisions and the political structure

Social changes

The early-modern European society gradually developed after the disasters of the 14th century as religious obedience and political loyalties declined in the wake of the Great Plague, the schism of the Church and prolonged dynastic wars. The rise of the cities and the emergence of the new burgher class eroded the societal, legal and economic order of feudalism.

The commercial enterprises of the mercantile elites in the quickly developing cities in South Germany (such as Augsburg and Nuremberg), with the most prominent families being the Gossembrots, Fuggers (the wealthiest family in Europe during the fifteenth and sixteenth centuries), Welsers, Hochstetters, Imholts, generated unprecedented financial means. As financiers to both the leading ecclesiastical and secular rulers, these families fundamentally influenced the political affairs in the empire during the fifteenth and sixteenth century. The increasingly money based economy also provoked social discontent among knights and peasants and predatory "robber knights" became common.

From 1438 the Habsburg dynasty, who had acquired control in the south-eastern empire over the Duchy of Austria, Bohemia and Hungary after the death of King Louis II in 1526, managed to permanently occupy the position of the Holy Roman Emperor until 1806 (with the exception of the years between 1742 and 1745).

Some Europe-wide revolutions were born in the Empire: the combination of the first modern postal system established by Maximilian (with the management under the Taxis family) with the printing system invented by Gutenberg produced a communication revolution – the Empire's decentralized nature made censorship difficult and this combined with the new communication system to facilitate free expression, thus elevating cultural life. The system also helped the authorities to disseminate orders and policies, boosted the Empire's coherence in general, and helped reformers like Luther to broadcast their views and communicate with each other effectively, thus contributing to the religious Reformation.

Maximilian's military reforms, especially his development of the Landsknechte, caused a military revolution that broke the back of the knight class and spread all over Europe shortly after his death.

Imperial reform

During his reign from 1493 to 1519, Maximilian I, in a combined effort with the Estates (who sometimes acted as opponents and sometimes as cooperators to him), his officials and his humanists, reformed the empire. A dual system of Supreme Courts (the Reichskammergericht and the Reichshofrat) was established (with the Reichshofrat playing a more efficient role during the Early Modern period), together with the formalized Reception of Roman Law; the Imperial Diet (Reichstag) became the all-important political forum and the supreme legal and constitutional institution, which would act as a guarantee for the preservation of the Empire in the long run; a Permanent Land Piece (Ewiger Landfriede) was declared in 1495 with regional leagues and unions providing the supporting structure, together with the creation of the Reichskreise (Imperial Circles, which would serve the purpose of organize imperial armies, collect taxes and enforce orders of the imperial institutions); the Imperial and Court Chanceries were combined to become the decisive government institution; the Landsknechte that Maximilian created became a form of imperial army; a national political culture began to emerge;  and the German language began to attain an unified form. The political structure remained incomplete and piecemeal though, mainly due to the failure of the Common Penny (an imperial tax) that the Estates resisted. Through many compromises between emperor and estates though, a flexible, future-oriented problem-solving mechanism for the Empire was formed,  together with a monarchy through which the emperor shared power with the Estates. Whether the Reform also equated to a (successful or unsuccessful) nation building process remains a debate.

The addition Nationis Germanicæ (of German Nation) to the emperor's title appeared first in the 15th century: in a 1486 law decreed by Frederick III and in 1512 in reference to the Imperial Diet in Cologne by Maximilian I. In 1525, the Heilbronn reform plan – the most advanced document of the German Peasants' War (Deutscher Bauernkrieg) – referred to the Reich as von Teutscher Nation (of German nation). During the fifteen century, the term "German nation" had witness a rise in use due to the growth of a "community of interests". The Estates also increasingly distinguished between their German Reich and the wider, "universal" Reich.

Protestant Reformation

In order to manage their ever growing expenses, the Renaissance Popes of the 15th and early 16th century promoted the excessive sale of indulgences and offices and titles of the Roman Curia.

In 1517, the monk Martin Luther published a pamphlet with 95 Theses that he posted in the town square of Wittenberg and handed copies to feudal lords. Whether he nailed them to a church door at Wittenberg remains unclear. The list detailed 95 assertions, he argued, represented corrupt practice of the Christian faith and misconduct within the Catholic Church. Although perhaps not Luther's chief concern, he received popular support for his condemnation of the sale of indulgences and clerical offices, the pope's and higher clergy's abuse of power and his doubts of the very idea of the institution of the Church and the papacy.

The Protestant Reformation was the first successful challenge to the Catholic Church and began in 1521 as Luther was outlawed at the Diet of Worms after his refusal to repent. The ideas of the reformation spread rapidly, as the new technology of the modern printing press ensured cheap mass copies and distribution of the theses and helped by the Emperor Charles V's wars with France and the Turks. Hiding in the Wartburg Castle, Luther translated the Bible into German, thereby greatly contributing to the establishment of the modern German language. This is highlighted by the fact that Luther spoke only a local dialect of minor importance during that time. After the publication of his Bible, his dialect suppressed others and constitutes to a great extent what is now modern German. With the protestation of the Lutheran princes at the Imperial Diet of Speyer in 1529 and the acceptance and adoption of the Lutheran Augsburg Confession by the Lutheran princes beginning in 1530, the separate Lutheran church was established.

The 1524/25 German Peasants' War, that began in the southwest in Alsace and Swabia and spread further east into Franconia, Thuringia and Austria, was a series of economic and religious revolts of the rural lower classes, encouraged by the rhetoric of various radical religious reformers and Anabaptists against the ruling feudal lords. Although occasionally assisted by war-experienced noblemen like Götz von Berlichingen and Florian Geyer (in Franconia) and the theologian Thomas Müntzer (in Thuringia), the peasant forces lacked military structure, skill, logistics and equipment and as many as 100,000 insurgents were eventually defeated and massacred by the territorial princes.

The Catholic Counter-Reformation, initiated in 1545 at the Council of Trent was spearheaded by the scholarly religious Jesuit order, that was founded just five years prior by several clerics around Ignatius of Loyola. Its intent was to challenge and contain the Protestant Reformation via apologetic and polemical writings and decrees, ecclesiastical reconfiguration, wars and imperial political maneuverings. In 1547, emperor Charles V defeated the Schmalkaldic League, a military alliance of Protestant rulers. The 1555 Peace of Augsburg decreed the recognition of the Lutheran Faith and religious division of the empire. It also stipulated the ruler's right to determine the official confession in his principality (Cuius regio, eius religio). The Counter-Reformation eventually failed to reintegrate the central and northern German Lutheran states. In 1608/1609 the Protestant Union and the Catholic League were formed.

Thirty Years' War, 1618–1648 

The 1618 to 1648 Thirty Years' War, that took place almost exclusively in the Holy Roman Empire has its origins, which remain widely debated, in the unsolved and recurring conflicts of the Catholic and Protestant factions. The Catholic emperor Ferdinand II attempted to achieve the religious and political unity of the empire, while the opposing Protestant Union forces were determined to defend their religious rights. The religious motive served as the universal justification for the various territorial and foreign princes, who over the course of several stages joined either of the two warring parties in order to gain land and power.

The conflict was sparked by the revolt of the Protestant nobility of Bohemia against emperor Matthias' succession policies. After imperial triumph at the Battle of White Mountain and a short-lived peace, the war grew to become a political European conflict by the intervention of King Christian IV of Denmark from 1625 to 1630, Gustavus Adolphus of Sweden from 1630 to 1648 and France under Cardinal Richelieu from 1635 to 1648. The conflict increasingly evolved into a struggle between the French House of Bourbon and the House of Habsburg for predominance in Europe, for which the central German territories of the empire served as the battleground.

The war ranks among the most catastrophic in history as three decades of constant warfare and destruction had left the land devastated. Marauding armies incessantly pillaged the countryside, seized and levied heavy taxes on cities and indiscriminately plundered the food stocks of the peasantry. There were also the countless bands of murderous outlaws, sick, homeless, disrupted people and invalid soldiery. Overall social and economic disruption caused a dramatic decline in population as a result of pandemic murder and random rape and killings, endemic infectious diseases, crop failures, famine, declining birth rates, wanton burglary, witch-hunts and the emigration of terrified people. Estimates vary between a 38% drop from 16 million people in 1618 to 10 million by 1650 and a mere 20% drop from 20 million to 16 million. The Altmark and Württemberg regions were especially hard hit, where it took generations to fully recover.

The war was the last major religious struggle in mainland Europe and ended in 1648 with the Peace of Westphalia. It resulted in increased autonomy for the constituent states of the Holy Roman Empire, limiting the power of the emperor. Most of Alsace was ceded to France, Western Pomerania and Bremen-Verden were given to Sweden as Imperial fiefs, and the Netherlands officially left the Empire.

Culture and literacy

The population of Germany reached about twenty million people by the mid-16th century, the great majority of whom were peasant farmers.

The Protestant Reformation was a triumph for literacy and the new printing press. Luther's translation of the Bible into High German (the New Testament was published in 1522; the Old Testament was published in parts and completed in 1534) was a decisive impulse for the increase of literacy of literacy in early modern Germany, and stimulated printing and distribution of religious books and pamphlets. From 1517 onward religious pamphlets flooded Germany and much of Europe. The Reformation instigated a media revolution as by 1530 over 10,000 individual works are published with a total of ten million copies. Luther strengthened his attacks on Rome by depicting a "good" against "bad" church. It soon became clear that print could be used for propaganda in the Reformation for particular agendas. Reform writers used pre-Reformation styles, clichés, and stereotypes and changed items as needed for their own purposes. Especially effective were Luther's Small Catechism, for use of parents teaching their children, and Larger Catechism, for pastors. Using the German vernacular they expressed the Apostles' Creed in simpler, more personal, Trinitarian language. Illustrations in the newly translated Bible and in many tracts popularized Luther's ideas. Lucas Cranach the Elder (1472–1553), the great painter patronized by the electors of Wittenberg, was a close friend of Luther, and illustrated Luther's theology for a popular audience. He dramatized Luther's views on the relationship between the Old and New Testaments, while remaining mindful of Luther's careful distinctions about proper and improper uses of visual imagery.

Luther's translation of the Bible into High German was also decisive for the German language and its evolution from Early New High German to Modern Standard German. The publication of Luther's Bible was a decisive moment in the spread of literacy in early modern Germany, and promoted the development of non-local forms of language and exposed all speakers to forms of German from outside their own area.

Science

Notable late fifteenth to early eighteenth-century polymaths include: Johannes Trithemius, one of the founder of modern cryptography, founder of steganography, as well as bibliography and literary studies as branches of knowledge; Conrad Celtes, the first and foremost German cartographic writer and "the greatest lyric genius and certainly the greatest organizer and popularizer of German Humanism"; Athanasius Kircher, described by Fletcher as "a founder figure of various disciplines—of geology (certainly vulcanology), musicology (as a surveyor of musical forms), museum curatorship, Coptology, to name a few—and might be claimed today as the first theorist of gravity and a long-term originator of the moving pictures (with his magic lantern shows). Through his many enthusiasms, moreover, he was the conduit of others' pursuits in the rapidly widening horizon of knowledge that marks the later Renaissance."; and Gottfried Wilhelm Leibniz, one of the greatest, if not the greatest "Universal genius", of all times.

Cartography developed strongly, with the center being Nuremberg, at the beginning of the sixteenth century. Martin Waldseemüller and Matthias Ringmann's Universalis Cosmographia and the 1513 edition of Geography marked the climax of a cartography revolution. The emperor himself dabbled in cartography.

In 1515, Johannes Stabius (court astronomer under Maximilian I), Albrecht Dürer and the astronomer Konrad Heinfogel produced the first planispheres of both southern and northerns hemispheres, also the first printed celestial maps. These maps prompted the revival of interest in the field of uranometry throughout Europe.

Astronomer Johannes Kepler from Weil der Stadt was one of the pioneering minds of empirical and rational research. Through rigorous application of the principles of the Scientific method he construed his laws of planetary motion. His ideas influenced contemporary Italian scientist Galileo Galilei and provided fundamental mechanical principles for Isaac Newton's theory of universal gravitation.

Colonies
German Colonies in the Americas existed because the Free Imperial Cities of Augsburg and Nuremberg got colonial rights in the Province of Venezuela or North of South America in return for debts owed by the Holy Roman Empire Charles V, who was also King of Spain. In 1528, Charles V issued a charter by which the Welser family possessed the rights to explore, rule and colonize the area, also with the motivation of searching for the legendary golden city of El Dorado. Their principal colony was Klein-Venedig. A never realized colonial project was Hanauish-Indies intended by Friedrich Casimir, Count of Hanau-Lichtenberg as a fief of the Dutch West India Company. The project failed due to a lack of funds and the outbreak of the Franco-Dutch War in 1672.

1648–1815

Rise of Prussia

Frederick William, ruler of Brandenburg-Prussia since 1640 and later called the Great Elector, acquired East Pomerania via the Peace of Westphalia in 1648. He reorganized his loose and scattered territories and managed to throw off the vassalage of Prussia under the Kingdom of Poland during the Second Northern War. In order to address the demographic problem of Prussia's largely rural population of about three million, he attracted the immigration and settlement of French Huguenots in urban areas. Many became craftsmen and entrepreneurs. King Frederick William I, known as the Soldier King, who reigned from 1713 to 1740, established the structures for the highly centralized Prussian state and raised a professional army, that was to play a central role. He also successfully operated a command economy that some historians consider mercantilist.

The total population of Germany (in its 1914 territorial extent) grew from 16 million in 1700 to 17 million in 1750 and reached 24 million in 1800. The 18th-century economy noticeably profited from widespread practical application of the Scientific method as greater yields and a more reliable agricultural production and the introduction of hygienic standards positively affected the birth rate – death rate balance.

Wars

Louis XIV of France waged a series of successful wars in order to extend the French territory. He occupied Lorraine (1670) and annexed the remainder of Alsace (1678–1681) that included the free imperial city of Straßburg. At the start of the Nine Years' War, he also invaded the Electorate of the Palatinate (1688–1697). Louis established a number of courts whose sole function was to reinterpret historic decrees and treaties, the Treaties of Nijmegen (1678) and the Peace of Westphalia (1648) in particular in favor of his policies of conquest. He considered the conclusions of these courts, the Chambres de réunion as sufficient justification for his boundless annexations. Louis' forces operated inside the Holy Roman Empire largely unopposed, because all available imperial contingents fought in Austria in the Great Turkish War. The Grand Alliance of 1689 took up arms against France and countered any further military advances of Louis. The conflict ended in 1697 as both parties agreed to peace talks after either side had realized, that a total victory was financially unattainable. The Treaty of Ryswick provided for the return of the Lorraine and Luxembourg to the empire and the abandoning of French claims to the Palatinate.

After the last-minute relief of Vienna from a siege and the imminent seizure by a Turkish force in 1683, the combined troops of the Holy League, that had been founded the following year, embarked on the military containment of the Ottoman Empire and reconquered Hungary in 1687. The Papal States, the Holy Roman Empire, the Polish–Lithuanian Commonwealth, the Republic of Venice and since 1686 Russia had joined the league under the leadership of Pope Innocent XI. Prince Eugene of Savoy, who served under emperor Leopold I, took supreme command in 1697 and decisively defeated the Ottomans in a series of spectacular battles and
manoeuvres. The 1699 Treaty of Karlowitz marked the end of the Great Turkish War and Prince Eugene continued his service for the Habsburg monarchy as president of the War Council. He effectively ended Turkish rule over most of the territorial states in the Balkans during the Austro-Turkish War of 1716–18. The Treaty of Passarowitz left Austria to freely establish royal domains in Serbia and the Banat and maintain hegemony in Southeast Europe, on which the future Austrian Empire was based.

Enlightened absolutism

Frederick II "the Great" is best known for his military genius and unique utilisation of the highly organized army to make Prussia one of the great powers in Europe as well as escaping from almost certain national disaster at the last minute. He was also an artist, author and philosopher, who conceived and promoted the concept of enlightened absolutism.

Austrian empress Maria Theresa succeeded in bringing about a favorable conclusion for her in the 1740 to 1748 war for recognition of her succession to the throne. However, Silesia was permanently lost to Prussia as a consequence of the Silesian Wars and the Seven Years' War. The 1763 Treaty of Hubertusburg ruled that Austria and Saxony had to relinquish all claims to Silesia. Prussia, that had nearly doubled its territory was eventually recognized as a great European power with the consequence that the politics of the following century were fundamentally influenced by German dualism, the rivalry of Austria and Prussia for supremacy in Central Europe.

The concept of enlightened absolutism, although rejected by the nobility and citizenry, was advocated in Prussia and Austria and implemented since 1763.  Prussian king Frederick II defended the idea in an essay and argued that the benevolent monarch simply is the first servant of the state, who effects his absolute political power for the benefit of the population as a whole. A number of legal reforms (e.g. the abolition of torture and the emancipation of the rural population and the Jews), the reorganization of the Prussian Academy of Sciences, the introduction of compulsory education for boys and girls and promotion of religious tolerance, among others, caused rapid social and economic development.

During 1772 to 1795 Prussia instigated the partitions of Poland by occupying the western territories of the former Polish–Lithuanian Commonwealth. Austria and Russia resolved to acquire the remaining lands with the effect that Poland ceased to exist as a sovereign state until 1918.

Smaller states

The smaller German states were overshadowed by Prussia and Austria. Bavaria had a rural economy. Saxony was in economically good shape, although numerous wars had taken their toll. During the time when Prussia rose rapidly within Germany, Saxony was distracted by foreign affairs. The House of Wettin concentrated on acquiring and then holding on to the Polish throne which was ultimately unsuccessful.

Many of the smaller states of Germany were run by bishops, who in reality were from powerful noble families and showed scant interest in religion. While none of the later ecclesial rulers reached the outstanding reputation of Mainz' Johann Philipp von Schönborn or Münster's Christoph Bernhard von Galen, some of them promoted Enlightenment like the benevolent and progressive Franz Ludwig von Erthal in Würzburg and Bamberg.

In Hesse-Kassel, the Landgrave Frederick II, ruled from 1760 to 1785 as an enlightened despot, and raised money by renting soldiers (called "Hessians") to Great Britain to help fight the American Revolutionary War. He combined Enlightenment ideas with Christian values, cameralist plans for central control of the economy, and a militaristic approach toward diplomacy.

Hanover did not have to support a lavish court—its rulers were also kings of England and resided in London. George III, elector (ruler) from 1760 to 1820, never once visited Hanover. The local nobility who ran the country opened the University of Göttingen in 1737; it soon became a world-class intellectual center. Baden sported perhaps the best government of the smaller states. Karl Friedrich ruled well for 73 years (1738–1811) and was an enthusiast for the Enlightenment; he abolished serfdom in 1783.

The smaller states failed to form coalitions with each other, and were eventually overwhelmed by Prussia. Between 1807 and 1871, Prussia swallowed up many of the smaller states, with minimal protest, then went on to found the German Empire. In the process, Prussia became too heterogeneous, lost its identity, and by the 1930s had become an administrative shell of little importance.

Nobility
The nobility represented the first estate in a typical early modern kingdom of Christian Europe, with Germany being no exception. The empire's pluralistic character also applied to its nobility, that greatly varied in power and wealth, ideas, ambition, loyalty and education. However, there existed the distinction between the Imperial nobility, the direct vassals of the emperor and the Territorial nobility, who have received their fief from the territorial princes. Many of whom had been impoverished as their standard of life and culture had declined since the end of the medieval period. In an ever more complex economy, they struggled to compete with the patricians and merchants of the cities. The Thirty Years' War marked the reversal of fortunes for those noblemen, who seized the initiative and had understood the requirements of higher education for a lucrative position in the post-war territorial administration. In the Prussian lands east of the Elbe river the system of manorial jurisdiction guaranteed near universal legal power and economic freedom for the local lords, called Junkers, who dominated not only the localities, but also the Prussian court, and especially the Prussian army. Increasingly after 1815, a centralized Prussian government based in Berlin took over the powers of the nobles, which in terms of control over the peasantry had been almost absolute. To help the nobility avoid indebtedness, Berlin set up a credit institution to provide capital loans in 1809, and extended the loan network to peasants in 1849. When the German Empire was established in 1871, the Junker nobility controlled the army and the navy, the bureaucracy, and the royal court; they generally set governmental policies.

Peasants and rural life
Peasants continued to center their lives in the village, where they were members of a corporate body, and to help manage the community resources and monitor the community life. In the east, they were serfs who were bound permanently to parcels of land. In most of Germany, farming was handled by tenant farmers who paid rents and obligatory services to the landlord, who was typically a nobleman. Peasant leaders supervised the fields and ditches and grazing rights, maintained public order and morals, and supported a village court which handled minor offenses. Inside the family the patriarch made all the decisions, and tried to arrange advantageous marriages for his children. Much of the villages' communal life centered around church services and holy days. In Prussia, the peasants drew lots to choose conscripts required by the army. The noblemen handled external relationships and politics for the villages under their control, and were not typically involved in daily activities or decisions.

The emancipation of the serfs came in 1770–1830, beginning with Schleswig in 1780. The peasants were now ex-serfs and could own their land, buy and sell it, and move about freely. The nobles approved for now they could buy land owned by the peasants. The chief reformer was Baron vom Stein (1757–1831), who was influenced by The Enlightenment, especially the free market ideas of Adam Smith. The end of serfdom raised the personal legal status of the peasantry. A bank was set up so that landowners could borrow government money to buy land from peasants (the peasants were not allowed to use it to borrow money to buy land until 1850). The result was that the large landowners obtained larger estates, and many peasants became landless tenants, or moved to the cities or to America. The other German states imitated Prussia after 1815. In sharp contrast to the violence that characterized land reform in the French Revolution, Germany handled it peacefully. In Schleswig the peasants, who had been influenced by the Enlightenment, played an active role; elsewhere they were largely passive. Indeed, for most peasants, customs and traditions continued largely unchanged, including the old habits of deference to the nobles whose legal authority remained quite strong over the villagers. Although the peasants were no longer tied to the same land as serfs had been, the old paternalistic relationship in East Prussia lasted into the 20th century.

The agrarian reforms in northwestern Germany in the era 1770–1870 were driven by progressive governments and local elites. They abolished feudal obligations and divided collectively owned common land into private parcels and thus created a more efficient market-oriented rural economy, which increased productivity and population growth and strengthened the traditional social order because wealthy peasants obtained most of the former common land, while the rural proletariat was left without land; many left for the cities or America. Meanwhile, the division of the common land served as a buffer preserving social peace between nobles and peasants. In the east, the serfs were emancipated but the Junker class maintained its large estates and monopolized political power.

Around 1800 the Catholic monasteries, which had large land holdings, were nationalized and sold off by the government. In Bavaria they had controlled 56% of the land.

Bourgeois values spread to rural Germany
A major social change occurring between 1750 and 1850, depending on region, was the end of the traditional "whole house" ("ganzes Haus") system, in which the owner's family lived together in one large building with the servants and craftsmen he employed. They reorganized into separate living arrangements. No longer did the owner's wife take charge of all the females in the different families in the whole house.  In the new system, farm owners became more professionalized and profit-oriented. They managed the fields and the household exterior according to the dictates of technology, science, and economics. Farm wives supervised family care and the household interior, to which strict standards of cleanliness, order, and thrift applied. The result was the spread of formerly urban bourgeois values into rural Germany.

The lesser families were now living separately on wages. They had to provide for their own supervision, health, schooling, and old-age. At the same time, because of the demographic transition, there were far fewer children, allowing for much greater attention to each child. Increasingly the middle-class family valued its privacy and its inward direction, shedding too-close links with the world of work. Furthermore, the working classes, the middle classes and the upper classes became physically, psychologically and politically more separate. This allowed for the emergence of working-class organizations. It also allowed for declining religiosity among the working-class, who were no longer monitored on a daily basis.

Enlightenment

Since the mid-18th century recognition and application of Enlightenment ideas, higher cultural, intellectual and spiritual standards have led to higher quality works of art in music, philosophy, science and literature. Philosopher Christian Wolff (1679–1754) was a pioneering author on a near universal number of Enlightenment rationality topics in Germany and established German as the language of philosophic reasoning, scholarly instruction and research.

In 1685, Margrave Frederick William of Prussia issued the Edict of Potsdam within a week after French king Louis XIV's Edict of Fontainebleau, that decreed the abolishment of the 1598 concession to free religious practice for Protestants. Frederick William offered his co-religionists, who are oppressed and assailed for the sake of the Holy Gospel and its pure doctrine...a secure and free refuge in all Our Lands. Around 20,000 Huguenot refugees arrived in an immediate wave and settled in the cities, 40% in Berlin, the ducal residence alone. The French Lyceum in Berlin was established in 1689 and the French language had by the end of the 17th century replaced Latin to be spoken universally in international diplomacy. The nobility and the educated middle-class of Prussia and the various German states increasingly used the French language in public conversation in combination with universal cultivated manners. Like no other German state, Prussia had access to and the skill set for the application of pan-European Enlightenment ideas to develop more rational political and administrative institutions. The princes of Saxony carried out a comprehensive series of fundamental fiscal, administrative, judicial, educational, cultural and general economic reforms. The reforms were aided by the country's strong urban structure and influential commercial groups, who modernized pre-1789 Saxony along the lines of classic Enlightenment principles.

Johann Gottfried von Herder (1744–1803) broke new ground in philosophy and poetry, as a leader of the Sturm und Drang movement of proto-Romanticism. Weimar Classicism ("Weimarer Klassik") was a cultural and literary movement based in Weimar that sought to establish a new humanism by synthesizing Romantic, classical, and Enlightenment ideas. The movement, from 1772 until 1805, involved Herder as well as polymath Johann Wolfgang von Goethe (1749–1832) and Friedrich Schiller (1759–1805), a poet and historian. Herder argued that every folk had its own particular identity, which was expressed in its language and culture. This legitimized the promotion of German language and culture and helped shape the development of German nationalism. Schiller's plays expressed the restless spirit of his generation, depicting the hero's struggle against social pressures and the force of destiny.

German music, sponsored by the upper classes, came of age under composers Johann Sebastian Bach (1685–1750), Joseph Haydn (1732–1809), and Wolfgang Amadeus Mozart (1756–1791).

Königsberg philosopher Immanuel Kant (1724–1804) tried to reconcile rationalism and religious belief, individual freedom, and political authority. Kant's work contained basic tensions that would continue to shape German thought – and indeed all of European philosophy – well into the 20th century. The ideas of the Enlightenment and their implementation received general approval and recognition as principal cause for widespread cultural progress.

Women

Before the 19th century, young women lived under the economic and disciplinary authority of their fathers until they married and passed under the control of their husbands. In order to secure a satisfactory marriage, a woman needed to bring a substantial dowry. In the wealthier families, daughters received their dowry from their families, whereas the poorer women needed to work in order to save their wages so as to improve their chances to wed. Under the German laws, women had property rights over their dowries and inheritances, a valuable benefit as high mortality rates resulted in successive marriages. Before 1789, the majority of women lived confined to society's private sphere, the home. Sagarra notes that The Age of Reason did not bring much more for women: men, including Enlightenment aficionados, believed that women were naturally destined to be principally wives and mothers. Within the educated classes, there was the belief that women needed to be sufficiently educated to be intelligent and agreeable interlocutors to their husbands. However, the lower-class women were expected to be economically productive in order to help their husbands make ends meet.

According to Kay Goodman, feminist scholars trace the beginning of German female literature (which paved the way for nineteenth century feminism) to the era of Romanticism (eighteenth century). Dorothea Erxleben, the first German woman doctor, challenged the social restrictions on the role of women, that defined them only as wives, mothers and caretakers.

There was a large number of female territorial regents between the sixteenth and the eighteenth centuries. By the eighteenth century, generally elite women could only attain political power (such as Maria Theresa or Maria Antonia of Saxony; Catherine the Great was ethnically German but attained political power in Russia) in the name of their husbands and sons.  Empress Eleonore Magdalene of Neuburg was one of the most powerful Habsburg imperial consorts.

The process of elimination of gender guardianship was a complex process, that primarily benefited businesswomen. Some of the most notable German businesswomen of this period included Glückel of Hameln, Anna Vandenhoeck, Karoline Kaulla, Aletta Haniel, Helene Amalie Krupp.

Katharina Henot, possibly the first German postmistress, was executed as an alleged witch in the midst of a legal battle between her family and the House of Thurn und Taxis. The position of Imperial Postmaster became hereditary through female line in 1621 under Ferdinand II, Holy Roman Emperor (it became hereditary through male line in 1615). In 1628, Alexandrine von Taxis, née de Rye, became Imperial Postmaster.

French Revolution, 1789–1815

German reaction to the French Revolution was mixed at first. German intellectuals celebrated the outbreak, hoping to see the triumph of Reason and The Enlightenment. The royal courts in Vienna and Berlin denounced the overthrow of the king and the threatened spread of notions of liberty, equality, and fraternity. By 1793, the execution of the French king and the onset of the Terror disillusioned the Bildungsbürgertum (educated middle classes). Reformers said the solution was to have faith in the ability of Germans to reform their laws and institutions in peaceful fashion.

Europe was racked by two decades of war revolving around France's efforts to spread its revolutionary ideals, and the opposition of reactionary royalty. War broke out in 1792 as Austria and Prussia invaded France, but were defeated at the Battle of Valmy (1792). The German lands saw armies marching back and forth, bringing devastation (albeit on a far lower scale than the Thirty Years' War, almost two centuries before), but also bringing new ideas of liberty and civil rights for the people. Prussia and Austria ended their failed wars with France but (with Russia) partitioned Poland among themselves in 1793 and 1795.

French consulate suzereignity
France took control of the Rhineland, imposed French-style reforms, abolished feudalism, established constitutions, promoted freedom of religion, emancipated Jews, opened the bureaucracy to ordinary citizens of talent, and forced the nobility to share power with the rising middle class. Napoleon created the Kingdom of Westphalia (1807–1813) as a model state. These reforms proved largely permanent and modernized the western parts of Germany. When the French tried to impose the French language, German opposition grew in intensity. A Second Coalition of Britain, Russia, and Austria then attacked France but failed. Napoleon established direct or indirect control over most of western Europe, including the German states apart from Prussia and Austria. The old Holy Roman Empire was little more than a farce; Napoleon simply abolished it in 1806 while forming new countries under his control. In Germany Napoleon set up the "Confederation of the Rhine", comprising most of the German states except Prussia and Austria.

Imperial French suzereignity
Under Frederick William II's weak rule (1786-.1797) Prussia had undergone a serious economic, political and military decline. His successor king Frederick William III tried to remain neutral during the War of the Third Coalition and French emperor Napoleon's dissolution of the Holy Roman Empire and reorganisation of the German principalities. Induced by the queen and a pro-war party Frederick William joined the Fourth Coalition in October 1806. Napoleon easily defeated the Prussian army at the Battle of Jena and occupied Berlin. Prussia lost its recently acquired territories in western Germany, its army was reduced to 42,000 men, no trade with Britain was allowed and Berlin had to pay Paris high reparations and fund the French army of occupation. Saxony changed sides to support Napoleon and joined the Confederation of the Rhine. Ruler Frederick Augustus I was rewarded with the title of king and given a part of Poland taken from Prussia, which became known as the Duchy of Warsaw.

After Napoleon's military fiasco in Russia in 1812, Prussia allied with Russia in the Sixth Coalition. A series of battles followed and Austria joined the alliance. Napoleon was decisively defeated in the Battle of Leipzig in late 1813. The German states of the Confederation of the Rhine defected to the Coalition against Napoleon, who rejected any peace terms. Coalition forces invaded France in early 1814, Paris fell and in April Napoleon surrendered. Prussia as one of the winners at the Congress of Vienna, gained extensive territory.

1815–1871

Overview

In 1815, continental Europe was in a state of overall turbulence and exhaustion, as a consequence of the French Revolutionary and Napoleonic Wars. The liberal spirit of the Enlightenment and Revolutionary era diverged toward Romanticism. The victorious members of the Coalition had negotiated a new peaceful balance of powers in Vienna and agreed to maintain a stable German heartland that keeps French imperialism at bay. However, the idea of reforming the defunct Holy Roman Empire was discarded. Napoleon's reorganization of the German states was continued and the remaining princes were allowed to keep their titles. In 1813, in return for guarantees from the Allies that the sovereignty and integrity of the Southern German states (Baden, Württemberg, and Bavaria) would be preserved, they broke with France.

German Confederation

During the 1815 Congress of Vienna the 39 former states of the Confederation of the Rhine joined the German Confederation, a loose agreement for mutual defense. Attempts of economic integration and customs coordination were frustrated by repressive anti-national policies. Great Britain approved of the union, convinced that a stable, peaceful entity in central Europe could discourage aggressive moves by France or Russia. Most historians, however, concluded, that the Confederation was weak and ineffective and an obstacle to German nationalism. The union was undermined by the creation of the Zollverein in 1834, the 1848 revolutions, the rivalry between Prussia and Austria and was finally dissolved in the wake of the Austro-Prussian War of 1866, to be replaced by the North German Confederation during the same year.

Society and economy

Population
Between 1815 and 1865 the population of the German Confederation (excluding Austria) grew around 60% from 21 million to 34 million. Simultaneously the Demographic Transition took place as the high birth rates and high death rates of the pre-industrial country shifted to low birth and death rates of the fast-growing industrialized urban economic and agricultural system. Increased agricultural productivity secured a steady food supply, as famines and epidemics declined. This allowed people to marry earlier, and have more children. The high birthrate was offset by a very high rate of infant mortality and after 1840, large-scale emigration to the United States. Emigration totaled at 480,000 in the 1840s, 1,200,000 in the 1850s, and at 780,000 in the 1860s. The upper and middle classes first practiced birth control, soon to be universally adopted.

Industrialization

In 1800, Germany's social structure was poorly suited to entrepreneurship or economic development. Domination by France during the French Revolution (1790s to 1815), however, produced important institutional reforms, that included the abolition of feudal restrictions on the sale of large landed estates, the reduction of the power of the guilds in the cities, and the introduction of a new, more efficient commercial law. The idea, that these reforms were beneficial for Industrialization has been contested. Nevertheless, traditionalism remained strong in the many small principalities. Until 1850, the guilds, the landed aristocracy, the churches and the government bureaucracies maintained many rules and restrictions that held entrepreneurship in low esteem and given little opportunity to develop. From the 1830s and 1840s, Prussia, Saxony and other states introduced agriculture based on sugar beets, turnips and potatoes, that yielded higher crops, which enabled a surplus rural population to move to industrial areas.

In the early 19th century the Industrial Revolution was in full swing in Britain, France, and Belgium. The various small federal states in Germany developed only slowly and independently as competition was strong. Early investments for the railway network during the 1830s came almost exclusively from private hands. Without a central regulatory agency the construction projects were quickly realized. Actual industrialization only took off after 1850 in the wake of the railroad construction. The textile industry grew rapidly, profiting from the elimination of tariff barriers by the Zollverein. During the second half of the 19th century the German industry grew exponentially and by 1900, Germany was an industrial world leader along with Britain and the United States.

Historian Thomas Nipperdey remarks:
<blockquote>On the whole, industrialisation in Germany must be considered to have been positive in its effects. Not only did it change society and the countryside, and finally the world...it created the modern world we live in. It solved the problems of population growth, under-employment and pauperism in a stagnating economy, and abolished dependency on the natural conditions of agriculture, and finally hunger. It created huge improvements in production and both short- and long-term improvements in living standards. However, in terms of social inequality, it can be assumed that it did not change the relative levels of income. Between 1815 and 1873 the statistical distribution of wealth was on the order of 77% to 23% for entrepreneurs and workers respectively. On the other hand, new problems arose, in the form of interrupted growth and new crises, such as urbanisation, "alienation", new underclasses, proletariat and proletarian misery, new injustices and new masters and, eventually, class warfare.</ref></blockquote>

Urbanization
In 1800, the population was predominantly rural, as only 10% lived in communities of 5,000 or more people, and only 2% lived in cities of more than 100,000 people. After 1815, the urban population grew rapidly, due to the influx of young people from the rural areas. Berlin grew from 172,000 in 1800, to 826,000 inhabitants in 1870, Hamburg from 130,000 to 290,000, Munich from 40,000 to 269,000 and Dresden from 60,000 to 177,000.

Railways

The takeoff stage of economic development came with the railroad revolution in the 1840s, which opened up new markets for local products, created a pool of middle managers, increased the demand for engineers, architects and skilled machinists and stimulated investments in coal and iron. Political disunity of three dozen states and a pervasive conservatism made it difficult to build railways in the 1830s. However, by the 1840s, trunk lines did link the major cities; each German state was responsible for the lines within its own borders. Economist Friedrich List summed up the advantages to be derived from the development of the railway system in 1841:
 1. As a means of national defence, it facilitates the concentration, distribution and direction of the army.
 2. It is a means to the improvement of the culture of the nation. It brings talent, knowledge and skill of every kind readily to market.
 3. It secures the community against dearth and famine, and against excessive fluctuation in the prices of the necessaries of life.
 4. It promotes the spirit of the nation, as it has a tendency to destroy the Philistine spirit arising from isolation and provincial prejudice and vanity. It binds nations by ligaments, and promotes an interchange of food and of commodities, thus making it feel to be a unit. The iron rails become a nerve system, which, on the one hand, strengthens public opinion, and, on the other hand, strengthens the power of the state for police and governmental purposes.

Lacking a technological base at first, engineering and hardware was imported from Britain. In many cities, the new railway shops were the centres of technological awareness and training, so that by 1850, Germany was self-sufficient in meeting the demands of railroad construction, and the railways were a major impetus for the growth of the new steel industry. Observers found that even as late as 1890, their engineering was inferior to Britain. However, German unification in 1870 stimulated consolidation, nationalisation into state-owned companies, and further rapid growth. Unlike the situation in France, the goal was the support of industrialisation. Eventually numerous lines criss-crossed the Ruhr area and other industrial centers and provided good connections to the major ports of Hamburg and Bremen. By 1880, 9,400 locomotives pulled 43,000 passengers and 30,000 tons of freight a day.

Newspapers and magazines

While there existed no national newspaper the many states issued a great variety of printed media, although they rarely exceeded regional significance. In a typical town existed one or two outlets, urban centers, such as Berlin and Leipzig had dozens. The audience was limited to a few percent of male adults, chiefly from the aristocratic and upper middle class. Liberal publishers outnumbered conservative ones by a wide margin. Foreign governments bribed editors to guarantee a favorable image. Censorship was strict, and the imperial government issued the political news that was supposed to be published. After 1871, strict press laws were enforced by Bismarck to contain the Socialists and hostile editors. Editors focused on political commentary, culture, the arts, high culture and the popular serialized novels. Magazines were politically more influential and attracted intellectual authors.

Science and culture during the 18th and 19th century
19th-century artists and intellectuals were greatly inspired by the ideas of the French Revolution and the great poets and writers Johann Wolfgang von Goethe (1749–1832), Gotthold Ephraim Lessing (1729–1781) and Friedrich Schiller (1759–1805). The Sturm und Drang romantic movement was embraced and emotion was given free expression in reaction to the perceived rationalism of the Enlightenment. Philosophical principles and methods were revolutionized by Immanuel Kant's paradigm shift. Ludwig van Beethoven (1770–1827) was the most influential composer of the period from classical to Romantic music. His use of tonal architecture in such a way as to allow significant expansion of musical forms and structures was immediately recognized as bringing a new dimension to music. His later piano music and string quartets, especially, showed the way to a completely unexplored musical universe, and influenced Franz Schubert (1797–1828) and Robert Schumann (1810–1856). In opera, a new Romantic atmosphere combining supernatural terror and melodramatic plot in a folkloric context was first successfully achieved by Carl Maria von Weber (1786–1826) and perfected by Richard Wagner (1813–1883) in his Ring Cycle. The Brothers Grimm (1785–1863 & 1786–1859) collected folk stories into the popular Grimm's Fairy Tales and are ranked among the founding fathers of German studies, who initiated the work on the Deutsches Wörterbuch ("The German Dictionary"), the most comprehensive work on the German language.

University professors developed international reputations, especially in the humanities led by history and philology, which brought a new historical perspective to the study of political history, theology, philosophy, language, and literature. With Georg Wilhelm Friedrich Hegel (1770–1831), Friedrich Wilhelm Joseph Schelling (1775–1854), Arthur Schopenhauer (1788–1860), Friedrich Nietzsche (1844–1900), Max Weber (1864–1920), Karl Marx (1818–1883) and Friedrich Engels (1820–1895) in philosophy, Friedrich Schleiermacher (1768–1834) in theology and Leopold von Ranke (1795–1886) in history became famous. The University of Berlin, founded in 1810, became the world's leading university. Von Ranke, for example, professionalized history and set the world standard for historiography. By the 1830s mathematics, physics, chemistry, and biology had emerged with world class science, led by Alexander von Humboldt (1769–1859) in natural science and Carl Friedrich Gauss (1777–1855) in mathematics. Young intellectuals often turned to politics, but their support for the failed revolution of 1848 forced many into exile.

Religion

Two main developments reshaped religion in Germany. Across the land, there was a movement to unite the larger Lutheran and the smaller Reformed Protestant churches. The churches themselves brought this about in Baden, Nassau, and Bavaria. However, in Prussia King Frederick William III was determined to handle unification entirely on his own terms, without consultation. His goal was to unify the Protestant churches, and to impose a single standardized liturgy, organization and even architecture. The long-term goal was to have fully centralized royal control of all the Protestant churches. In a series of proclamations over several decades the Church of the Prussian Union was formed, bringing together the more numerous Lutherans, and the less numerous Reformed Protestants. The government of Prussia now had full control over church affairs, with the king himself recognized as the leading bishop. Opposition to unification came from the "Old Lutherans" in Silesia who clung tightly to the theological and liturgical forms they had followed since the days of Luther. The government attempted to crack down on them, so they went underground. Tens of thousands migrated, to South Australia, and especially to the United States, where they formed the Missouri Synod, which is still in operation as a conservative denomination. Finally in 1845 a new king Frederick William IV offered a general amnesty and allowed the Old Lutherans to form a separate church association with only nominal government control.

From the religious point of view of the typical Catholic or Protestant, major changes were underway in terms of a much more personalized religiosity that focused on the individual more than the church or the ceremony. The rationalism of the late 19th century faded away, and there was a new emphasis on the psychology and feeling of the individual, especially in terms of contemplating sinfulness, redemption, and the mysteries and the revelations of Christianity. Pietistic revivals were common among Protestants. Among, Catholics there was a sharp increase in popular pilgrimages. In 1844 alone, half a million pilgrims made a pilgrimage to the city of Trier in the Rhineland to view the Seamless robe of Jesus, said to be the robe that Jesus wore on the way to his crucifixion. Catholic bishops in Germany had historically been largely independent of Rome, but now the Vatican exerted increasing control, a new "ultramontanism" of Catholics highly loyal to Rome. A sharp controversy broke out in 1837–38 in the largely Catholic Rhineland over the religious education of children of mixed marriages, where the mother was Catholic and the father Protestant. The government passed laws to require that these children always be raised as Protestants, contrary to Napoleonic law that had previously prevailed and allowed the parents to make the decision. It put the Catholic Archbishop under house arrest. In 1840, the new King Frederick William IV sought reconciliation and ended the controversy by agreeing to most of the Catholic demands. However Catholic memories remained deep and led to a sense that Catholics always needed to stick together in the face of an untrustworthy government.

Politics of restoration and revolution

After Napoleon

After the fall of Napoleon, Europe's statesmen convened in Vienna in 1815 for the reorganisation of European affairs, under the leadership of the Austrian Prince Metternich. The political principles agreed upon at this Congress of Vienna included the restoration, legitimacy and solidarity of rulers for the repression of revolutionary and nationalist ideas.

The German Confederation was founded, a loose union of 39 states (35 ruling princes and 4 free cities) under Austrian leadership, with a Federal Diet meeting in Frankfurt am Main. It was a loose coalition that failed to satisfy most nationalists. The member states largely went their own way, and Austria had its own interests.

In 1819, a student radical assassinated the reactionary playwright August von Kotzebue, who had scoffed at liberal student organisations. In one of the few major actions of the German Confederation, Prince Metternich called a conference that issued the repressive Carlsbad Decrees, designed to suppress liberal agitation against the conservative governments of the German states. The Decrees terminated the fast-fading nationalist fraternities, removed liberal university professors, and expanded the censorship of the press. The decrees began the "persecution of the demagogues", which was directed against individuals who were accused of spreading revolutionary and nationalist ideas. Among the persecuted were the poet Ernst Moritz Arndt, the publisher Johann Joseph Görres and the "Father of Gymnastics" Ludwig Jahn.

In 1834, the Zollverein was established, a customs union between Prussia and most other German states, but excluding Austria. As industrialisation developed, the need for a unified German state with a uniform currency, legal system, and government became more and more obvious.

1848

Growing discontent with the political and social order imposed by the Congress of Vienna led to the outbreak, in 1848, of the March Revolution in the German states. In May the German National Assembly (the Frankfurt Parliament) met in Frankfurt to draw up a national German constitution.

But the 1848 revolution turned out to be unsuccessful: King Frederick William IV of Prussia refused the imperial crown, the Frankfurt parliament was dissolved, the ruling princes repressed the risings by military force, and the German Confederation was re-established by 1850. Many leaders went into exile, including a number who went to the United States and became a political force there.

1850s
The 1850s were a period of extreme political reaction. Dissent was vigorously suppressed, and many Germans emigrated to America following the collapse of the 1848 uprisings. Frederick William IV became extremely depressed and melancholic during this period, and was surrounded by men who advocated clericalism and absolute divine monarchy. The Prussian people once again lost interest in politics. Prussia not only expanded its territory but began to industrialize rapidly, while maintaining a strong agricultural base.

Bismarck takes charge (1862–1866)
In 1857, the Prussian king Frederick William IV suffered a stroke and his brother William served as regent until 1861 when he became King William I. Although conservative, William was very pragmatic. His most significant accomplishment was the naming of Otto von Bismarck as Prussian minister president in 1862. The cooperation of Bismarck, Defense Minister Albrecht von Roon, and Field Marshal Helmut von Moltke set the stage for the military victories over Denmark, Austria, and France, that led to the unification of Germany.

In 1863–64, disputes between Prussia and Denmark over Schleswig escalated, which was not part of the German Confederation, and which Danish nationalists wanted to incorporate into the Danish kingdom. The conflict led to the Second War of Schleswig in 1864. Prussia, joined by Austria, easily defeated Denmark and occupied Jutland. The Danes were forced to cede both the Duchy of Schleswig and the Duchy of Holstein to Austria and Prussia. The subsequent management of the two duchies led to tensions between Austria and Prussia. Austria wanted the duchies to become an independent entity within the German Confederation, while Prussia intended to annex them. The disagreement served as a pretext for the Seven Weeks War between Austria and Prussia, that broke out in June 1866. In July, the two armies clashed at Sadowa-Königgrätz (Bohemia) in an enormous battle involving half a million men. Prussian superior logistics and the modern breech-loading needle guns superiority over the slow muzzle-loading rifles of the Austrians, proved to be elementary for Prussia's victory. The battle had also decided the struggle for hegemony in Germany and Bismarck was deliberately lenient with defeated Austria, that was to play only a subordinate role in future German affairs.

North German Confederation, 1866–1871

After the Seven Weeks War, the German Confederation was dissolved and the North German Federation (German Norddeutscher Bund) was established under the leadership of Prussia. Austria was excluded and its immense influence over Germany finally came to an end. The North German Federation was a transitional organisation that existed from 1867 to 1871, between the dissolution of the German Confederation and the founding of the German Empire.

German Empire, 1871–1918

Overview

Chancellor Otto von Bismarck determined the political course of the German Empire until 1890. He fostered alliances in Europe to contain France on the one hand and aspired to consolidate Germany's influence in Europe on the other. His principal domestic policies focused on the suppression of socialism and the reduction of the strong influence of the Roman Catholic Church on its adherents. He issued a series of anti-socialist laws in accord with a set of social laws, that included universal health care, pension plans and other social security programs. His Kulturkampf policies were vehemently resisted by Catholics, who organized political opposition in the Center Party (Zentrum). German industrial and economic power had grown to match Britain by 1900.

In 1888, the young and ambitious Kaiser Wilhelm II became emperor. He rejected advice from experienced politicians and ordered Bismarck's resignation in 1890. He opposed Bismarck's careful and delicate foreign policy and was determined to pursue colonialist policies, as Britain and France had been doing for centuries. The Kaiser promoted the active colonization of Africa and Asia for the lands that were not already colonies of other European powers. The Kaiser took a mostly unilateral approach in Europe only allied with the Austro-Hungarian Empire, and embarked on a dangerous naval arms race with Britain. His aggressive and erroneous policies greatly contributed to the situation in which the assassination of the Austrian-Hungarian crown prince would spark off World War I.

Bismarck era
Bismarck was the dominant personality not just in Germany but in all of Europe and indeed the entire diplomatic world 1870–1890, but historians continue to debate his personality. Lothar Gall and Ernst Engelberg consider Bismarck was a future-oriented modernizer. In sharp contrast, Jonathan Steinberg decided he was basically a traditional Prussian whose highest priorities were to reinforce the monarchy, the Army, and the social and economic dominance of his own Junker class, thereby being responsible for a tragic history after his removal in 1890.

The new empire

In 1868, the Spanish queen Isabella II was deposed in the Glorious Revolution, leaving the country's throne vacant. When Prussia suggested the Hohenzollern candidate, Prince Leopold as successor, France vehemently objected. The matter evolved into a diplomatic scandal and in July 1870, France resolved to end it in a full-scale war. The conflict was quickly decided as Prussia, joined by forces of a pan-German alliance never gave up the tactical initiative. A series of victories in north-eastern France followed and another French army group was simultaneously encircled at Metz. A few weeks later, the French army contingent under Emperor Napoleon III's personal command was finally forced to capitulate in the fortress of Sedan. Napoleon was taken prisoner and a provisional government hastily proclaimed in Paris. The new government resolved to fight on and tried to reorganize the remaining armies while the Germans settled down to besiege Paris. The starving city surrendered in January 1871 and Jules Favre signed the surrender at Versailles. France was forced to pay indemnities of 5 billion francs and cede Alsace-Lorraine to Germany. This conclusion left the French national psyche deeply humiliated and further aggravated the French–German enmity.

During the Siege of Paris, the German princes assembled in the Hall of Mirrors of the Palace of Versailles on 18 January 1871 and announced the establishment of the German Empire and proclaimed the Prussian King Wilhelm I as German Emperor. The act unified all ethnic German states with the exception of Austria in the Little German solution of a federal economic, political and administrative unit. Bismarck, was appointed to serve as Chancellor.

A federal empire
The new empire was a federal union of 25 states that varied considerably in size, demography, constitution, economy, culture, religion and socio-political development. However, even Prussia itself, which accounted for two-thirds of the territory as well as of the population, had emerged from the empire's periphery as a newcomer. It also faced colossal cultural and economic internal divisions. The Prussian provinces of Westphalia and the Rhineland for example had been under French control during the previous decades. The local people, who had benefited from the liberal, civil reforms, that were derived from the ideas of the French Revolution, had only little in common with predominantly rural communities in authoritarian and disjointed Junker estates of Pommerania.
The inhabitants of the smaller territorial lands, especially in central and southern Germany greatly rejected the Prussianized concept of the nation and preferred to associate such terms with their individual home state. The Hanseatic port cities of Hamburg, Bremen and Lübeck ranked among the most ferocious opponents of the so-called contract with Prussia. As advocates of free trade, they objected to Prussian ideas of economic integration and refused to sign the renewed Zollverein (Custom Union) treaties until 1888. The Hanseatic merchants' overseas economic success corresponded with their globalist mindset. The citizen of Hamburg, whom Bismark characterized as extremely irritating and the German ambassador in London as the worst Germans we have, were particularly appalled by Prussian militarism and its unopposed growing influence.

The Prusso-German authorities were aware of necessary integration concepts as the results and the 52% voter turnout of the first imperial elections had clearly demonstrated. Historians increasingly argue, that the nation-state was forged through empire. National identity was expressed in bombastic imperial stone iconography and was to be achieved as an imperial people, with an emperor as head of state and it was to develop imperial ambitions – domestic, European and global.

Bismarck's domestic policies as Chancellor of Germany were based on his effort to universally adopt the idea of the Protestant Prussian state and achieve the clear separation of church and state in all imperial principalities. In the Kulturkampf (lit.: culture struggle) from 1871 to 1878, he tried to minimize the influence of the Roman Catholic Church and its political arm, the Catholic Centre Party, via secularization of all education and introduction of civil marriage, but without success. The Kulturkampf antagonised many Protestants as well as Catholics and was eventually abandoned. The millions of non-German imperial subjects, like the Polish, Danish and French minorities, were left with no choice but to endure discrimination or accept the policies of Germanisation.

A three class system
 Aristocracy
The new Empire provided attractive top level career opportunities for the national nobility in the various branches of the consular and civil services and the army. As a consequence the aristocratic near total control of the civil sector guaranteed a dominant voice in the decision making in the universities and the churches. The 1914 German diplomatic corps consisted of 8 princes, 29 counts, 20 barons, 54 representants of the lower nobility and a mere 11 commoners. These commoners were indiscriminately recruited from elite industrialist and banking families. The consular corps employed numerous commoners, that however, occupied positions of little to no executive power. The Prussian tradition to reserve the highest military ranks for young aristocrats was adopted and the new constitution put all military affairs under the direct control of the Emperor and beyond control of the Reichstag. With its large corps of reserve officers across Germany, the military strengthened its role as "The estate which upheld the nation", and historian Hans-Ulrich Wehler added: "it became an almost separate, self-perpetuating caste".

Power increasingly was centralized among the 7000 aristocrats, who resided in the national capital of Berlin and neighboring Potsdam. Berlin's rapidly increasing rich middle-class copied the aristocracy and tried to marry into it. A peerage could permanently boost a rich industrial family into the upper reaches of the establishment. However, the process tended to work in the other direction as the nobility became industrialists. For example, 221 of the 243 mines in Silesia were owned by nobles or by the King of Prussia himself.
 Middle class
The middle class in the cities grew exponentially, although it never acquired the powerful parliamentary representation and legislative rights as in France, Britain or the United States. The Association of German Women's Organizations or BDF was established in 1894 to encompass the proliferating women's organizations that had emerged since the 1860s. From the beginning the BDF was a bourgeois organization, its members working toward equality with men in such areas as education, financial opportunities, and political life. Working-class women were not welcome and were organized by the Socialists.
 Working class
The rise of the Socialist Workers' Party (later known as the Social Democratic Party of Germany, SPD), aimed to peacefully establish a socialist order through the transformation of the existing political and social conditions. From 1878, Bismarck tried to oppose the growing social democratic movement by outlawing the party's organisation, its assemblies and most of its newspapers. Nonetheless, the Social Democrats grew stronger and Bismarck initiated his social welfare program in 1883 in order to appease the working class.

Bismarck built on a tradition of welfare programs in Prussia and Saxony that began as early as the 1840s. In the 1880s he introduced old age pensions, accident insurance, medical care, and unemployment insurance that formed the basis of the modern European welfare state. His paternalistic programs won the support of German industry because its goals were to win the support of the working classes for the Empire and reduce the outflow of immigrants to America, where wages were higher but welfare did not exist. Bismarck further won the support of both industry and skilled workers by his high tariff policies, which protected profits and wages from American competition, although they alienated the liberal intellectuals who wanted free trade.

Kulturkampf

Bismarck would not tolerate any power outside Germany—as in Rome—having a say in domestic affairs. He launched the Kulturkampf ("culture war") against the power of the pope and the Catholic Church in 1873, but only in the state of Prussia. This gained strong support from German liberals, who saw the Catholic Church as the bastion of reaction and their greatest enemy. The Catholic element, in turn, saw in the National-Liberals the worst enemy and formed the Center Party.

Catholics, although nearly a third of the national population, were seldom allowed to hold major positions in the Imperial government, or the Prussian government. After 1871, there was a systematic purge of the remaining Catholics; in the powerful interior ministry, which handled all police affairs, the only Catholic was a messenger boy. Jews were likewise heavily discriminated against.

Most of the Kulturkampf was fought out in Prussia, but Imperial Germany passed the Pulpit Law which made it a crime for any cleric to discuss public issues in a way that displeased the government. Nearly all Catholic bishops, clergy, and laymen rejected the legality of the new laws and defiantly faced the increasingly heavy penalties and imprisonments imposed by Bismarck's government. Historian Anthony Steinhoff reports the casualty totals:

As of 1878, only three of eight Prussian dioceses still had bishops, some 1,125 of 4,600 parishes were vacant, and nearly 1,800 priests ended up in jail or in exile ... Finally, between 1872 and 1878, numerous Catholic newspapers were confiscated, Catholic associations and assemblies were dissolved, and Catholic civil servants were dismissed merely on the pretence of having Ultramontane sympathies.

Bismarck underestimated the resolve of the Catholic Church and did not foresee the extremes that this struggle would attain. The Catholic Church denounced the harsh new laws as anti-Catholic and mustered the support of its rank and file voters across Germany. In the following elections, the Center Party won a quarter of the seats in the Imperial Diet. The conflict ended after 1879 because Pope Pius IX died in 1878 and Bismarck broke with the Liberals to put his main emphasis on tariffs, foreign policy, and attacking socialists. Bismarck negotiated with the conciliatory new pope Leo XIII. Peace was restored, the bishops returned and the jailed clerics were released. Laws were toned down or taken back (Mitigation Laws 1880–1883 and Peace Laws 1886/87), but the laws concerning education, civil registry of marriages and religious disaffiliation remained in place. The Center Party gained strength and became an ally of Bismarck, especially when he attacked socialism.

Foreign policies and relations

Chancellor Bismarck's imperial foreign policy basically aimed at security and the prevention of a Franco-Russian alliance, in order to avoid a likely Two-front war. The League of Three Emperors was signed in 1873 by Russia, Austria, and Germany. It stated that republicanism and socialism were common enemies and that the three powers would discuss any matters concerning foreign policy. Bismarck needed good relations with Russia in order to keep France isolated. Russia fought a victorious war against the Ottoman Empire from 1877 to 1878 and attempted to establish the Principality of Bulgaria, that was strongly opposed by France and Britain in particular, as they were long concerned with the preservation of the Ottoman Empire and Russian containment at the Bosphorus Strait and the Black Sea. Germany hosted the Congress of Berlin in 1878, where a more moderate peace settlement was agreed upon.

In 1879, Germany formed the Dual Alliance with Austria-Hungary, an agreement of mutual military assistance in the case of an attack from Russia, which was not satisfied with the agreement of the Congress of Berlin. The establishment of the Dual Alliance led Russia to take a more conciliatory stance and in 1887, the so-called Reinsurance Treaty was signed between Germany and Russia. In it, the two powers agreed on mutual military support in the case that France attacked Germany or an Austrian attack on Russia. Russia turned its attention eastward to Asia and remained largely inactive in European politics for the next 25 years. In 1882, Italy, seeking supporters for its interests in North Africa against France's colonial policy, joined the Dual Alliance, which became the Triple Alliance. In return for German and Austrian support, Italy committed itself to assisting Germany in the case of a French attack.

Bismarck had always argued that the acquisition of overseas colonies was impractical and the burden of administration and maintenance would outweigh the benefits. Eventually, Bismarck gave way, and a number of colonies were established in Africa (Togo, the Cameroons, German South-West Africa, and German East Africa) and in Oceania (German New Guinea, the Bismarck Archipelago, and the Marshall Islands). Consequently, Bismarck initiated the Berlin Conference of 1885, a formal meeting of the European colonial powers, who sought to "established international guidelines for the acquisition of African territory" (see Colonisation of Africa). Its outcome, the General Act of the Berlin Conference, can be seen as the formalisation of the "Scramble for Africa" and "New Imperialism".

Wilhelminian Era (1888–1918)

Wilhelm II

Emperor William I died in 1888. His son Frederick III, open for a more liberal political course, reigned only for ninety-nine days, as he was stricken with throat cancer and died three months after his coronation. His son Wilhelm II followed him on the throne at the age of 29. Wilhelm rejected the liberal ideas of his parents and embarked on a conservative autocratic rule. He early on decided to replace the political elite and in March 1890 he forced chancellor Bismarck into retirement. Following his principle of "Personal Regiment", Wilhelm was determined to exercise maximum influence on all government affairs.

Alliances and diplomacy

The young Kaiser Wilhelm set out to apply his imperialist ideas of Weltpolitik ("world politics"), as he envisaged a gratuitously aggressive political course to increase the empire's influence in and control over the world. After the removal of Bismarck, foreign policies were tackled with by the Kaiser and the Federal Foreign Office under Friedrich von Holstein. Wilhelm's increasingly erratic and reckless conduct was unmistakably related to character deficits and the lack of diplomatic skills. The foreign office's rather sketchy assessment of the current situation and its recommendations for the empire's most suitable course of action were:
First a long-term coalition between France and Russia had to fall apart, secondly, Russia and Britain would never get together, and finally, Britain would eventually seek an alliance with Germany.
Subsequently, Wilhelm refused to renew the Reinsurance Treaty with Russia. Russia promptly formed a closer relationship with France in the Dual Alliance of 1894, as both countries were concerned about the novel disagreeability of Germany. Furthermore, Anglo–German relations provided, from a British point of view, no basis for any consensus as the Kaiser refused to divert from his, although somewhat peculiarly desperate and anachronistic, aggressive imperial engagement and the naval arms race in particular. Von Holstein's analysis proved to be mistaken on every point, Wilhelm, however, failed too, as he did not adopt a nuanced political dialogue. Germany was left gradually isolated and dependent on the Triple Alliance with Austria-Hungary, and Italy. This agreement was hampered by differences between Austria and Italy and in 1915 Italy left the alliance.

In 1897, Admiral Alfred von Tirpitz, state secretary of the German Imperial Naval Office devised his initially rather practical, yet nonetheless ambitious plan to build a sizeable naval force. Although basically posing only an indirect threat as a Fleet in being, Tirpitz theorized, that its mere existence would force Great Britain, dependent on unrestricted movement on the seas, to agree to diplomatic compromises. Tirpitz started the program of warship construction in 1898 and enjoyed the full support of Kaiser Wilhelm. Wilhelm entertained less rational ideas on the fleet, that circled around his romantic childhood dream to have a "fleet of  own some day" and his obsessive adherence to direct his policies along the line of Alfred Thayer Mahan's work The Influence of Sea Power upon History. In exchange for the eastern African island of Zanzibar, Germany had bargained the island of Heligoland in the German Bight with Britain in 1890, and converted the island into a naval base and installed immense coastal defense batteries. Britain considered the imperial German endeavours to be a dangerous infringement on the century-old delicate balance of global affairs and trade on the seas under British control. The British, however, resolved to keep up the naval arms race and introduced the highly advanced new Dreadnought battleship concept in 1907. Germany quickly adopted the concept and by 1910 the arms race again escalated.

In the First Moroccan Crisis of 1905, Germany nearly clashed with Britain and France when the latter attempted to establish a protectorate over Morocco. Kaiser Wilhelm II was upset at having not been informed about French intentions, and declared their support for Moroccan independence. William II made a highly provocative speech regarding this. The following year, a conference was held in which all of the European powers except Austria-Hungary (by now little more than a German satellite) sided with France. A compromise was brokered by the United States where the French relinquished some, but not all, control over Morocco.

The Second Moroccan Crisis of 1911 saw another dispute over Morocco erupt when France tried to suppress a revolt there. Germany, still smarting from the previous quarrel, agreed to a settlement whereby the French ceded some territory in central Africa in exchange for Germany's renouncing any right to intervene in Moroccan affairs. This confirmed French control over Morocco, which became a full protectorate of that country in 1912.

Economy

By 1890, the economy continued to industrialize and grow on an even higher rate than during the previous two decades and increased dramatically in the years leading up to World War I. Growth rates for the individual branches and sectors often varied considerably, and periodical figures provided by the Kaiserliches Statistisches Amt ("Imperial Statistical Bureau) are often disputed or just assessments. Classification and naming of internationally traded commodities and exported goods was still in progress and the structure of production and export had changed during four decades. Published documents provide numbers such as: The proportion of goods manufactured by the modern industry was approximately 25% in 1900, while the proportion of consumer related products in manufactured exports stood at 40%. Reasonably exact are the figures for the entire industrial production between 1870 and 1914, which increased about 500%.

Historian J. A. Perkins argued that more important than Bismarck's new tariff on imported grain was the introduction of the sugar beet as a main crop. Farmers quickly abandoned traditional, inefficient practices in favor of modern methods, including the use of artificial fertilizers and mechanical tools. Intensive methodical farming of sugar and other root crops made Germany the most efficient agricultural producer in Europe by 1914. Even so, farms were usually small in size and women did much of the field work. An unintended consequence was the increased dependence on migratory, especially foreign, labor.

The basics of the modern chemical research laboratory layout and the introduction of essential equipment and instruments such as Bunsen burners, the Petri dish, the Erlenmeyer flask, task-oriented working principles and team research originated in 19th-century Germany and France. The organisation of knowledge acquisition was further refined by laboratory integration in research institutes of the universities and the industries. Germany acquired the leading role in the world's Chemical industry by the late 19th century through strictly organized methodology. In 1913, the German Chemical industry produced almost 90 percent of the global supply of dyestuffs and sold about 80 percent of its production abroad.

Germany became Europe's leading steel-producing nation in the 1890s, thanks in large part to the protection from American and British competition afforded by tariffs and cartels. The leading firm was "Friedrich Krupp AG Hoesch-Krupp", run by the Krupp family. The merger of several major firms into the Vereinigte Stahlwerke (United Steel Works) in 1926 was modeled on the U.S. Steel corporation in the United States. The new company emphasized rationalization of management structures and modernization of the technology; it employed a multi-divisional structure and used return on investment as its measure of success. By 1913, American and German exports dominated the world steel market, as Britain slipped to third place.

In machinery, iron and steel, and other industries, German firms avoided cut-throat competition and instead relied on trade associations. Germany was a world leader because of its prevailing "corporatist mentality", its strong bureaucratic tradition, and the encouragement of the government. These associations regulate competition and allowed small firms to function in the shadow of much larger companies.

Women

In the nineteenth century, the literary salons (generally presided over by women) played a great role in civilizing the society.  Right under the shadow of Bismarck, the salonists Marie von Schleinitz and Anna von Helmholtz operated successful and influential scholarly circles predominated by liberal ideas.

Germany's unification process after 1871 was heavily dominated by men and give priority to the "Fatherland" theme and related male issues, such as military prowess. Nevertheless, middle-class women enrolled in the Bund Deutscher Frauenvereine, the Union of German Feminist Organizations (BDF). Founded in 1894, it grew to include 137 separate women's rights groups from 1907 until 1933, when the Nazi regime disbanded the organization. The BDF gave national direction to the proliferating women's organizations that had sprung up since the 1860s. From the beginning the BDF was a bourgeois organization, its members working toward equality with men in such areas as education, financial opportunities, and political life. Working-class women were not welcome; they were organized by the Socialists.

Formal organizations for promoting women's rights grew in numbers during the Wilhelmine period. German feminists began to network with feminists from other countries, and participated in the growth of international organizations.

Colonies

By the 1890s, German colonial expansion in Asia and the Pacific (Kiauchau in China, the Marianas, the Caroline Islands, Samoa) led to frictions with Britain, Russia, Japan and the United States. The construction of the Baghdad Railway, financed by German banks, was designed to eventually connect Germany with the Turkish Empire and the Persian Gulf, but it also collided with British and Russian geopolitical interests.

The largest colonial enterprises were in Africa. The harsh treatment of the Nama and Herero in what is now Namibia in Africa in 1906–07 led to charges of genocide against the Germans. Historians are examining the links and precedents between the Herero and Namaqua Genocide and the Holocaust of the 1940s.

Other claimed territories of the German Colonial Empire are: Bear Island (occupied in 1899), Togo-Hinterlands, German Somali Coast, Katanga Territories, Pondoland (failed attempt by ), Nyassaland (Mozambique), Southwestern Madagascar, Santa Lucia Bay (South Africa) (failed attempt in 1884), and the Farasan Islands.

World War I

Causes
Ethnic demands for nation states upset the balance between the empires that dominated Europe, leading to World War I, which started in August 1914. Germany stood behind its ally Austria in a confrontation with Serbia, but Serbia was under the protection of Russia, which was allied to France. Germany was the leader of the Central Powers, which included Austria-Hungary, the Ottoman Empire, and later Bulgaria; arrayed against them were the Allies, consisting chiefly of Russia, France, Britain, and in 1915 Italy.

In explaining why neutral Britain went to war with Germany, author Paul M. Kennedy recognized it was critical for war that Germany become economically more powerful than Britain, but he downplays the disputes over economic trade imperialism, the Baghdad Railway, confrontations in Central and Eastern Europe, high-charged political rhetoric and domestic pressure-groups. Germany's reliance time and again on sheer power, while Britain increasingly appealed to moral sensibilities, played a role, especially in seeing the invasion of Belgium as a necessary military tactic or a profound moral crime. The German invasion of Belgium was not important because the British decision had already been made and the British were more concerned with the fate of France. Kennedy argues that by far the main reason was London's fear that a repeat of 1870 – when Prussia and the German states smashed France – would mean that Germany, with a powerful army and navy, would control the English Channel and northwest France. British policy makers insisted that would be a catastrophe for British security.

Western Front

In the west, Germany sought a quick victory by encircling Paris using the Schlieffen Plan. But it failed due to Belgian resistance, Berlin's diversion of troops, and very stiff French resistance on the Marne, north of Paris. The Western Front became an extremely bloody battleground of trench warfare. The stalemate lasted from 1914 until early 1918, with ferocious battles that moved forces a few hundred yards at best along a line that stretched from the North Sea to the Swiss border. The British imposed a tight naval blockade in the North Sea which lasted until 1919, sharply reducing Germany's overseas access to raw materials and foodstuffs. Food scarcity became a serious problem by 1917. The United States joined with the Allies in April 1917. The entry of the United States into the war – following Germany's declaration of unrestricted submarine warfare – marked a decisive turning-point against Germany.

Total casualties on the Western Front were 3,528,610 killed and 7,745,920 wounded.

Eastern Front
More wide open was the fighting on the Eastern Front. In the east, there were decisive victories against the Russian army, the trapping and defeat of large parts of the Russian contingent at the Battle of Tannenberg, followed by huge Austrian and German successes. The breakdown of Russian forces – exacerbated by internal turmoil caused by the 1917 Russian Revolution – led to the Treaty of Brest-Litovsk the Bolsheviks were forced to sign on 3 March 1918 as Russia withdrew from the war. It gave Germany control of Eastern Europe. Spencer Tucker says, "The German General Staff had formulated extraordinarily harsh terms that shocked even the German negotiator." When Germany later complained that the Treaty of Versailles of 1919 was too harsh on them, the Allies responded that it was more benign than Brest-Litovsk.

1918

By defeating Russia in 1917, Germany was able to bring hundreds of thousands of combat troops from the east to the Western Front, giving it a numerical advantage over the Allies. By retraining the soldiers in new storm-trooper tactics, the Germans expected to unfreeze the Battlefield and win a decisive victory before the American army arrived in strength. However, the spring offensives all failed, as the Allies fell back and regrouped, and the Germans lacked the reserves necessary to consolidate their gains. In the summer, with the Americans arriving at 10,000 a day, and the German reserves exhausted, it was only a matter of time before multiple Allied offenses destroyed the German army.

Homefront
Although war was not expected in 1914, Germany rapidly mobilized its civilian economy for the war effort, the economy was handicapped by the British blockade that cut off food supplies.

Steadily conditions deteriorated rapidly on the home front, with severe food shortages reported in all urban areas. Causes involved the transfer of many farmers and food workers into the military, an overburdened railroad system, shortages of coal, and especially the British blockade that cut off imports from abroad. The winter of 1916–1917 was known as the "turnip winter", because that vegetable, usually fed to livestock, was used by people as a substitute for potatoes and meat, which were increasingly scarce. Thousands of soup kitchens were opened to feed the hungry people, who grumbled that the farmers were keeping the food for themselves. Even the army had to cut the rations for soldiers. Morale of both civilians and soldiers continued to sink. According to historian William H. MacNeil:
By 1917, after three years of war, the various groups and bureaucratic hierarchies which had been operating more or less independently of one another in peacetime (and not infrequently had worked at cross purposes) were subordinated to one (and perhaps the most effective) of their number: the General Staff. Military officers controlled civilian government officials, the staffs of banks, cartels, firms, and factories, engineers and scientists, workingmen, farmers-indeed almost every element in German society; and all efforts were directed in theory and in large degree also in practice to forwarding the war effort.

1918 was the year of the deadly 1918 Spanish Flu pandemic which struck hard at a population weakened by years of malnutrition.

Revolution 1918

The end of October 1918, in Wilhelmshaven, in northern Germany, saw the beginning of the German Revolution of 1918–19. Units of the German Navy refused to set sail for a last, large-scale operation in a war which they saw as good as lost, initiating the uprising. On 3 November, the revolt spread to other cities and states of the country, in many of which workers' and soldiers' councils were established. Meanwhile, Hindenburg and the senior commanders had lost confidence in the Kaiser and his government. The Kaiser and all German ruling princes abdicated. On 9 November 1918, the Social Democrat Philipp Scheidemann proclaimed a Republic.

On 11 November, the Compiègne armistice was signed, ending the war. The Treaty of Versailles was signed on 28 June 1919. Germany was to cede Alsace-Lorraine to France. Eupen-Malmédy would temporarily be ceded to Belgium, with a plebiscite to be held to allow the people the choice of the territory either remaining with Belgium or being returned to German control. Following a plebiscite, the territory was allotted to Belgium on 20 September 1920. The future of North Schleswig was to be decided by plebiscite. In the Schleswig Plebiscites, the Danish-speaking population in the north voted for Denmark and the southern, German speaking populace, part voted for Germany. Schleswig was thus partitioned. Holstein remained German without a referendum. Memel was ceded to the Allied and Associated powers, to decide the future of the area. On 9 January 1923, Lithuanian forces invaded the territory. Following negotiations, on 8 May 1924, the League of Nations ratified the annexation on the grounds that Lithuania accepted the Memel Statute, a power-sharing arrangement to protect non-Lithuanians in the territory and its autonomous status. Until 1929, German-Lithuanian co-operation increased and this power sharing arrangement worked. Poland was restored and most of the provinces of Posen and West Prussia, and some areas of Upper Silesia were reincorporated into the reformed country after plebiscites and independence uprisings. All German colonies were to be handed over to League of Nations, who then assigned them as Mandates to Australia, France, Japan, New Zealand, Portugal, and the United Kingdom. The new owners were required to act as a disinterested trustee over the region, promoting the welfare of its inhabitants in a variety of ways until they were able to govern themselves. The left and right banks of the Rhine were to be permanently demilitarised. The industrially important Saarland was to be governed by the League of Nations for 15 years and its coalfields administered by France. At the end of that time a plebiscite was to determine the Saar's future status. To ensure execution of the treaty's terms, Allied troops would occupy the left (German) bank of the Rhine for a period of 5–15 years. The German army was to be limited to 100,000 officers and men; the general staff was to be dissolved; vast quantities of war material were to be handed over and the manufacture of munitions rigidly curtailed. The navy was to be similarly reduced, and no military aircraft were allowed. Germany was also required to pay reparations for all civilian damage caused during the war.

Weimar Republic, 1919–1933

Overview

The humiliating peace terms in the Treaty of Versailles provoked bitter indignation throughout Germany, and seriously weakened the new democratic regime. In December 1918, the Communist Party of Germany (KPD) was founded, and in 1919 it tried and failed to overthrow the new republic. Adolf Hitler in 1919 took control of the new National Socialist German Workers' Party (NSDAP), which failed in a coup in Munich in 1923. Both parties, as well as parties supporting the republic, built militant auxiliaries that engaged in increasingly violent street battles. Electoral support for both parties increased after 1929 as the Great Depression hit the economy hard, producing many unemployed men who became available for the paramilitary units. The Nazis (formerly the German Workers' Party), with a mostly rural and lower middle class base, overthrew the Weimar regime and ruled Germany in 1933–1945.

The early years

On 11 August 1919, the Weimar constitution came into effect, with Friedrich Ebert as first President.

On 30 December 1918, the Communist Party of Germany was founded by the Spartacus League, who had split from the Social Democratic Party during the war. It was headed by Rosa Luxemburg and Karl Liebknecht, and rejected the parliamentary system. In 1920, about 300,000 members from the Independent Social Democratic Party of Germany joined the party, transforming it into a mass organization. The Communist Party had a following of about 10% of the electorate.

In the first months of 1920, the Reichswehr was to be reduced to 100,000 men, in accordance with the Treaty of Versailles. This included the dissolution of many Freikorps – units made up of volunteers. In an attempt at a coup d'état in March 1920, the Kapp Putsch, extreme right-wing politician Wolfgang Kapp let Freikorps soldiers march on Berlin and proclaimed himself Chancellor of the Reich. After four days the coup d'état collapsed, due to popular opposition and lack of support by the civil servants and the officers. Other cities were shaken by strikes and rebellions, which were bloodily suppressed.

Germany was the first state to establish diplomatic relations with the new Soviet Union. Under the Treaty of Rapallo, Germany accorded the Soviet Union de jure recognition, and the two signatories mutually cancelled all pre-war debts and renounced war claims. For the next twenty years Russia and Germany would work together helping to re-establish a military build up in Germany, and assist Russia in creating an industrial power under the weight of centralised planning of Lenin's communism.

When Germany defaulted on its reparation payments, French and Belgian troops occupied the heavily industrialised Ruhr district (January 1923). The German government encouraged the population of the Ruhr to passive resistance: shops would not sell goods to the foreign soldiers, coal-miners would not dig for the foreign troops, trams in which members of the occupation army had taken a seat would be left abandoned in the middle of the street. The passive resistance proved effective, insofar as the occupation became a loss-making deal for the French government. But the Ruhr fight also led to hyperinflation, and many who lost all their fortune would become bitter enemies of the Weimar Republic, and voters of the anti-democratic right. See 1920s German inflation.

In September 1923, the deteriorating economic conditions led Chancellor Gustav Stresemann to call an end to the passive resistance in the Ruhr. In November, his government introduced a new currency, the Rentenmark (later: Reichsmark), together with other measures to stop the hyperinflation. In the following six years the economic situation improved. In 1928, Germany's industrial production even regained the pre-war levels of 1913.

The national elections of 1924 led to a swing to the right. Field Marshal Paul von Hindenburg was elected President in 1925.

In October 1925, the Treaty of Locarno was signed by Germany, France, Belgium, Britain and Italy; it recognised Germany's borders with France and Belgium. Moreover, Britain, Italy and Belgium undertook to assist France in the case that German troops marched into the demilitarised Rheinland. Locarno paved the way for Germany's admission to the League of Nations in 1926.

Reparations

The actual amount of reparations that Germany was obliged to pay out was not the 132 billion marks decided in the London Schedule of 1921 but rather the 50 billion marks stipulated in the A and B Bonds. Historian Sally Marks says the "C bonds" were entirely chimerical—a device to fool the public into thinking Germany would pay much more. The actual total payout from 1920 to 1931 (when payments were suspended indefinitely) was 20 billion German gold marks, worth about US$5 billion or £1 billion stg. 12.5 billion was cash that came mostly from loans from New York bankers. The rest was goods like coal and chemicals, or from assets like railway equipment. The reparations bill was fixed in 1921 on the basis of a German capacity to pay, not on the basis of Allied claims. The highly publicized rhetoric of 1919 about paying for all the damages and all the veterans' benefits was irrelevant for the total, but it did determine how the recipients spent their share. Germany owed reparations chiefly to France, Britain, Italy and Belgium; the US received $100 million.

Economic collapse and political problems, 1929–1933
The Wall Street Crash of 1929 marked the beginning of the worldwide Great Depression, which hit Germany as hard as any nation. In July 1931, the Darmstätter und Nationalbank – one of the biggest German banks – failed. In early 1932, the number of unemployed had soared to more than 6,000,000.

On top of the collapsing economy came a political crisis: the political parties represented in the Reichstag were unable to build a governing majority in the face of escalating extremism from the far right (the Nazis, NSDAP). In March 1930, President Hindenburg appointed Heinrich Brüning Chancellor, invoking article 48 of Weimar's constitution, which allowed him to override the Parliament. To push through his package of austerity measures against a majority of Social Democrats, Communists and the NSDAP (Nazis), Brüning made use of emergency decrees and dissolved Parliament. In March and April 1932, Hindenburg was re-elected in the German presidential election of 1932.

The Nazi Party was the largest party in the national elections of 1932. On 31 July 1932 it received 37.3% of the votes, and in the election on 6 November 1932 it received less, but still the largest share, 33.1%, making it the biggest party in the Reichstag. The Communist KPD came third, with 15%. Together, the anti-democratic parties of the far right were now able to hold a considerable share of seats in Parliament, but they were at sword's point with the political left, fighting it out in the streets. The Nazis were particularly successful among Protestants, among unemployed young voters, among the lower middle class in the cities and among the rural population. It was weakest in Catholic areas and in large cities. On 30 January 1933, pressured by former Chancellor Franz von Papen and other conservatives, President Hindenburg appointed Hitler as Chancellor.

Science and culture in 19th and 20th century

The Weimar years saw a flowering of German science and high culture, before the Nazi regime resulted in a decline in the scientific and cultural life in Germany and forced many renowned scientists and writers to flee.
German recipients dominated the Nobel prizes in science. Germany dominated the world of physics before 1933, led by Hermann von Helmholtz, Wilhelm Conrad Röntgen, Albert Einstein, Otto Hahn, Max Planck and Werner Heisenberg. Chemistry likewise was dominated by German professors and researchers at the great chemical companies such as BASF and Bayer and persons like Justus von Liebig, Fritz Haber and Emil Fischer. Theoretical mathematicians Georg Cantor in the 19th century and David Hilbert in the 20th century. Karl Benz, the inventor of the automobile, and Rudolf Diesel were pivotal figures of engineering, and Wernher von Braun, rocket engineer. Ferdinand Cohn, Robert Koch and Rudolph Virchow were three key figures in microbiology.

Among the most important German writers were Thomas Mann (1875–1955), Hermann Hesse (1877–1962) and Bertolt Brecht (1898–1956). The reactionary historian Oswald Spengler wrote The Decline of the West (1918–23) on the inevitable decay of Western Civilization, and influenced intellectuals in Germany such as Martin Heidegger, Max Scheler, and the Frankfurt School, as well as intellectuals around the world.

After 1933, Nazi proponents of "Aryan physics", led by the Nobel Prize-winners Johannes Stark and Philipp Lenard, attacked Einstein's theory of relativity as a degenerate example of Jewish materialism in the realm of science. Many scientists and humanists emigrated; Einstein moved permanently to the U.S. but some of the others returned after 1945.

Nazi Germany, 1933–1945

The Nazi regime restored economic prosperity and ended mass unemployment using heavy spending on the military, while suppressing labor unions and strikes. The return of prosperity gave the Nazi Party enormous popularity, with only minor, isolated and subsequently unsuccessful cases of resistance among the German population over the 12 years of rule. The Gestapo (secret police) under Heinrich Himmler destroyed the political opposition and persecuted the Jews, trying to force them into exile, while taking their property. The Party took control of the courts, local government, and all civic organizations except the Protestant and Catholic churches. All expressions of public opinion were controlled by Hitler's propaganda minister, Joseph Goebbels, who made effective use of film, mass rallies, and Hitler's hypnotic speaking. The Nazi state idolized Hitler as its Führer (leader), putting all powers in his hands. Nazi propaganda centered on Hitler and was quite effective in creating what historians called the "Hitler Myth"—that Hitler was all-wise and that any mistakes or failures by others would be corrected when brought to his attention. In fact Hitler had a narrow range of interests and decision making was diffused among overlapping, feuding power centers; on some issues he was passive, simply assenting to pressures from whoever had his ear. All top officials reported to Hitler and followed his basic policies, but they had considerable autonomy on a daily basis.

Establishment of the Nazi regime

In order to secure a majority for his Nazi Party in the Reichstag, Hitler called for new elections. On the evening of 27 February 1933, the Reichstag building was set afire. Hitler swiftly blamed an alleged Communist uprising, and convinced President Hindenburg to sign the Reichstag Fire Decree, which rescinded most German civil liberties, including rights of assembly and freedom of the press. The decree allowed the police to detain people indefinitely without charges or a court order. Four thousand members of the Communist Party of Germany were arrested. Communist agitation was banned, but at this time not the Communist Party itself. Communists and Socialists were brought into hastily prepared Nazi concentration camps such as Kemna concentration camp, where they were at the mercy of the Gestapo, the newly established secret police force. Communist Reichstag deputies were taken into protective custody (despite their constitutional privileges).

Despite the terror and unprecedented propaganda, the last free General Elections of 5 March 1933, while resulting in 43.9% failed to give the majority for the NSDAP as Hitler had hoped. Together with the German National People's Party (DNVP), however, he was able to form a slim majority government. On 23 March 1933, the Enabling Act, an amendment to the Weimar Constitution, passed in the Reichstag by a vote of 444 to 94, marking the beginning of Nazi Germany. To obtain the two-thirds majority needed to pass the bill, accommodations were made to the Catholic Centre Party, and the Nazis used the provisions of the Reichstag Fire Decree to keep several Social Democratic deputies from attending, and the Communists deputies had already been banned. This amendment allowed Hitler and his cabinet to pass laws—even laws that violated the constitution—without the consent of the president or the Reichstag. The Enabling Act formed the basis for the dictatorship and the dissolution of the Länder; the trade unions and all political parties other than the Nazi Party were suppressed. A centralised totalitarian state was established, no longer based on the liberal Weimar constitution. Germany withdrew from the League of Nations shortly thereafter. The coalition parliament was rigged by defining the absence of arrested and murdered deputies as voluntary and therefore cause for their exclusion as wilful absentees. Subsequently, in July the Centre Party was voluntarily dissolved in a quid pro quo with the Pope under the anti-communist Pope Pius XI for the Reichskonkordat; and by these manoeuvres Hitler achieved movement of these Catholic voters into the Nazi Party, and a long-awaited international diplomatic acceptance of his regime. According to Professor Dick Geary the Nazis gained a larger share of their vote in Protestant areas than in Catholic areas, in the elections held between 1928 and November 1932. The Communist Party was proscribed in April 1933.

Thereafter, the Chief of Staff of the SA, Ernst Röhm, demanded more political and military power for him and his men, which caused anxiety among military, industrial, and political leaders. In response, Hitler used the SS and Gestapo to purge the entire SA leadership—along with a number of Hitler's political adversaries (such as Gregor Strasser and former chancellor Kurt von Schleicher). It became known as the Night of the Long Knives and took place from 30 June to 2 July 1934. As a reward, the SS became an independent organisation under the command of the Reichsführer-SS Heinrich Himmler. He would rise to become Chief of German Police in June 1936 and already had control over the concentration camps system. Upon Hindenburg's death on 2 August 1934, Hitler's cabinet passed a law proclaiming the presidency to be vacant and transferred the role and powers of the head of state to Hitler as Chancellor and Führer (Leader).

Antisemitism and the Holocaust

The Nazi regime was particularly hostile towards Jews, who became the target of unending antisemitic propaganda attacks. The Nazis attempted to convince the German people to view and treat Jews as "subhumans" and immediately after winning almost 44% of parliamentary seats in the 1933 federal elections the Nazis imposed a nationwide boycott of Jewish businesses. In March 1933 the first official Nazi concentration camp was established at Dachau in Bavaria and from 1933 to 1935 the Nazi regime consolidated their power. The Law for the Restoration of the Professional Civil Service passed on 7 April 1933, which forced all Jewish civil servants to retire from the legal profession and the civil service. The Nuremberg Laws of 1935 banned sexual relations between Jews and Germans and only those of German or related blood were eligible to be considered citizens; the remainder were classed as state subjects, without citizenship rights. This stripped Jews, Roma and others of their legal rights. Jews continued to suffer persecution under the Nazi regime, exemplified by the Kristallnacht pogrom of 1938, and about half of Germany's 500,000 Jews fled the country before 1939, after which escape became almost impossible.

In 1941, the Nazi leadership decided to implement a plan that they called the "Final Solution" which came to be known as the Holocaust. Under the plan, Jews and other "lesser races" along with political opponents from Germany as well as occupied countries were systematically murdered at murder sites, and starting in 1942, at extermination camps. Between 1941 and 1945 Jews, Gypsies, Slavs, communists, homosexuals, the mentally and physically disabled and members of other groups were targeted and methodically murdered – the origin of the word "genocide". In total approximately 17 million people were killed during the Holocaust including 1.5 million Jewish children.

Military

In 1935, Hitler officially re-established the Luftwaffe (air force) and reintroduced universal military service. This was in breach of the Treaty of Versailles; Britain, France and Italy issued notes of protest. Hitler had the officers swear their personal allegiance to him. In 1936, German troops marched into the demilitarised Rhineland. As the territory was part of Germany, the British and French governments did not feel that attempting to enforce the treaty was worth the risk of war. The move strengthened Hitler's standing in Germany. His reputation swelled further with the 1936 Summer Olympics, which were held in the same year in Berlin, and proved another great propaganda success for the regime as orchestrated by master propagandist Joseph Goebbels.

Women

Historians have paid special attention to the efforts by Nazi Germany to reverse the gains women made before 1933, especially in the relatively liberal Weimar Republic. It appears the role of women in Nazi Germany changed according to circumstances. Theoretically the Nazis advocated a patriarchal society in which the German woman would recognise that her "world is her husband, her family, her children, and her home". However, before 1933, women played important roles in the Nazi organization and were allowed some autonomy to mobilize other women. After Hitler came to power in 1933, feminist groups were shut down or incorporated into the National Socialist Women's League, which coordinated groups throughout the country to promote feminine virtues, motherhood and household activities. Courses were offered on childrearing, sewing and cooking. The Nazi regime did promote a liberal code of conduct regarding heterosexual relations among Germans and was sympathetic to women who bore children out of wedlock. The Lebensborn (Fountain of Life) association, founded by Himmler in 1935, created a series of maternity homes where single mothers could be accommodated during their pregnancies.

As Germany prepared for war, large numbers were incorporated into the public sector and with the need for full mobilization of factories by 1943, all women under the age of fifty were required to register with the employment office for work assignments to help the war effort. Women's wages remained unequal and women were denied positions of leadership or control. In 1944–45 more than 500,000 women were volunteer uniformed auxiliaries in the German armed forces (Wehrmacht). About the same number served in civil aerial defense, 400,000 volunteered as nurses, and many more replaced drafted men in the wartime economy. In the Luftwaffe they served in auxiliary roles helping to operate the anti-aircraft systems that shot down Allied bombers.

Foreign policy

Hitler's diplomatic strategy in the 1930s was to make seemingly reasonable demands, threatening war if they were not met. When opponents tried to appease him, he accepted the gains that were offered, then went to the next target. That aggressive strategy worked as Germany pulled out of the League of Nations (1933), rejected the Versailles Treaty and began to re-arm (1935), won back the Saar (1935), remilitarized the Rhineland (1936), formed an alliance ("axis") with Mussolini's Italy (1936), sent massive military aid to Franco in the Spanish Civil War (1936–39), annexed Austria (1938), took over Czechoslovakia after the British and French appeasement of the Munich Agreement of 1938, formed a peace pact with Joseph Stalin's Soviet Union in August 1939, and finally invaded Poland on 1 September 1939. Britain and France declared war on Germany two days later and World War II in Europe began.

After establishing the "Rome-Berlin axis" with Benito Mussolini, and signing the Anti-Comintern Pact with Japan – which was joined by Italy a year later in 1937 – Hitler felt able to take the offensive in foreign policy. On 12 March 1938, German troops marched into Austria, where an attempted Nazi coup had been unsuccessful in 1934. When Austrian-born Hitler entered Vienna, he was greeted by loud cheers. Four weeks later, 99% of Austrians voted in favour of the annexation (Anschluss) of their country to the German Reich. After Austria, Hitler turned to Czechoslovakia, where the 3.5 million-strong Sudeten German minority was demanding equal rights and self-government. At the Munich Conference of September 1938, Hitler, the Italian leader Benito Mussolini, British Prime Minister Neville Chamberlain and French Prime Minister Édouard Daladier agreed upon the cession of Sudeten territory to the German Reich by Czechoslovakia. Hitler thereupon declared that all of German Reich's territorial claims had been fulfilled. However, hardly six months after the Munich Agreement, in March 1939, Hitler used the smoldering quarrel between Slovaks and Czechs as a pretext for taking over the rest of Czechoslovakia as the Protectorate of Bohemia and Moravia. In the same month, he secured the return of Memel from Lithuania to Germany. Chamberlain was forced to acknowledge that his policy of appeasement towards Hitler had failed.

World War II

At first Germany was very successful in its military operations. In less than three months (April – June 1940), Germany conquered Denmark, Norway, the Low Countries, and France. The unexpectedly swift defeat of France resulted in an upswing in Hitler's popularity and an upsurge in war fever. Hitler made peace overtures to the new British leader Winston Churchill in July 1940, but Churchill remained dogged in his defiance. Churchill had major financial, military, and diplomatic help from President Franklin D. Roosevelt in the U.S. Hitler's bombing campaign against Britain (September 1940 – May 1941) failed. Some 43,000 British civilians were killed and 139,000 wounded in the Blitz; much of London was destroyed, with 1,400,245 buildings destroyed or damaged. Germany's armed forces invaded the Soviet Union in June 1941 – weeks behind schedule due to the invasion of Yugoslavia – but swept forward until they reached the gates of Moscow. Hitler had assembled more than 4,000,000 troops, including 1,000,000 from his Axis allies. The Soviets had lost nearly 3,000,000 killed in action, while 3,500,000 Soviet troops were captured in the first six months of the war. The Einsatzgruppen (Nazi mobile death squads) executed all Soviet Jews that it located, while the Germans went to Jewish households and forced the families into concentration camps for labor or to extermination camps for death.

The tide began to turn in December 1941, when the invasion of the Soviet Union hit determined resistance in the Battle of Moscow and Hitler declared war on the United States in the wake of the Japanese Pearl Harbor attack. After surrender in North Africa and losing the Battle of Stalingrad in 1942–43, the Germans were forced into the defensive. By late 1944, the United States, Canada, France, and Great Britain were closing in on Germany in the West, while the Soviets were victoriously advancing in the East.

In 1944–45, Soviet forces completely or partially liberated Romania, Bulgaria, Hungary, Yugoslavia, Poland, Czechoslovakia, Austria, Denmark, and Norway. Nazi Germany collapsed as Berlin was taken by the Soviet Union's Red Army in a fight to the death on the city streets. 2,000,000 Soviet troops took part in the assault, and they faced 750,000 German troops. 78,000–305,000 Soviets were killed, while 325,000 German civilians and soldiers were killed. Hitler committed suicide on 30 April 1945. The final German Instrument of Surrender was signed on 8 May 1945, marking the end of Nazi Germany.

By September 1945, Nazi Germany and its Axis partners (mainly Italy and Japan) had all been defeated, chiefly by the forces of the Soviet Union, the United States, and Great Britain. Much of Europe lay in ruins, over 60 million people worldwide had been killed (most of them civilians), including approximately 6 million Jews and 11 million non-Jews in what became known as the Holocaust. World War II resulted in the destruction of Germany's political and economic infrastructure and led directly to its partition, considerable loss of territory (especially in the East), and historical legacy of guilt and shame.

Germany during the Cold War, 1945–1990

As a consequence of the defeat of Nazi Germany in 1945 and the onset of the Cold War in 1947, the country's territory was shrunk and split between the two global blocs in the East and West, a period known as the division of Germany. Millions of refugees from Central and Eastern Europe moved west, most of them to West Germany. Two countries emerged: West Germany was a parliamentary democracy, a NATO member, a founding member of what since became the European Union as one of the world's largest economies and under allied military control until 1955, while East Germany was a totalitarian Communist dictatorship controlled by the Soviet Union as a satellite of Moscow. With the collapse of Communism in Europe in 1989, reunion on West Germany's terms followed.

No one doubted Germany's economic and engineering prowess; the question was how long bitter memories of the war would cause Europeans to distrust Germany, and whether Germany could demonstrate it had rejected totalitarianism and militarism and embraced democracy and human rights.

Expulsion 

At the Potsdam Conference, Germany was divided into four military occupation zones by the Allies and did not regain independence until 1949. The provinces east of the Oder and Neisse rivers (the Oder-Neisse line) were transferred to Poland and Russia (Kaliningrad oblast), pending a final peace conference with Germany, which eventually never took place. Most of the remaining German population was expelled. Around 6.7 million Germans living in "west-shifted" Poland, mostly within previously German lands, and the 3 million in German-settled regions of Czechoslovakia were deported west.

Post-war chaos

The total of German war dead was 8% to 10% out of a prewar population of 69,000,000, or between 5.5 million and 7 million people. This included 4.5 million in the military, and between 1 and 2 million civilians. There was chaos as 11 million foreign workers and POWs left, while soldiers returned home and more than 14 million displaced German-speaking refugees from both the eastern provinces and East-Central and Eastern Europe were expelled from their native land and came to the western German lands, often foreign to them. During the Cold War, the West German government estimated a death toll of 2.2 million civilians due to the flight and expulsion of Germans and through forced labour in the Soviet Union. This figure remained unchallenged until the 1990s, when some historians put the death toll at 500,000–600,000 confirmed deaths. In 2006, the German government reaffirmed its position that 2.0–2.5 million deaths occurred.

Denazification removed, imprisoned, or executed most top officials of the old regime, but most middle and lower ranks of civilian officialdom were not seriously affected. In accordance with the Allied agreement made at the Yalta Conference, millions of POWs were used as forced labor by the Soviet Union and other European countries.

In the East, the Soviets crushed dissent and imposed another police state, often employing ex-Nazis in the dreaded Stasi. The Soviets extracted about 23% of the East German GNP for reparations, while in the West reparations were a minor factor.

In 1945–46 housing and food conditions were bad, as the disruption of transport, markets, and finances slowed a return to normal. In the West, bombing had destroyed the fourth of the housing stock, and over 10 million refugees from the east had crowded in, most living in camps. Food production in 1946–48 was only two-thirds of the prewar level, while grain and meat shipments – which usually supplied 25% of the food – no longer arrived from the East. Furthermore, the end of the war brought the end of large shipments of food seized from occupied nations that had sustained Germany during the war. Coal production was down 60%, which had cascading negative effects on railroads, heavy industry, and heating. Industrial production fell more than half and reached prewar levels only at the end of 1949.

Allied economic policy originally was one of industrial disarmament plus building the agricultural sector. In the western sectors, most of the industrial plants had minimal bomb damage and the Allies dismantled 5% of the industrial plants for reparations.

However, deindustrialization became impractical and the U.S. instead called for a strong industrial base in Germany so it could stimulate European economic recovery. The U.S. shipped food in 1945–47 and made a $600 million loan in 1947 to rebuild German industry. By May 1946 the removal of machinery had ended, thanks to lobbying by the U.S. Army. The Truman administration finally realised that economic recovery in Europe could not go forward without the reconstruction of the German industrial base on which it had previously been dependent. Washington decided that an "orderly, prosperous Europe requires the economic contributions of a stable and productive Germany".

In 1945, the occupying powers took over all newspapers in Germany and purged them of Nazi influence. The American occupation headquarters, the Office of Military Government, United States (OMGUS) began its own newspaper based in Munich, Die Neue Zeitung. It was edited by German and Jewish émigrés who fled to the United States before the war. Its mission was to encourage democracy by exposing Germans to how American culture operated. The paper was filled with details on American sports, politics, business, Hollywood, and fashions, as well as international affairs.

East Germany

In 1949, the western half of the Soviet zone became the "Deutsche Demokratische Republik" – "DDR" ("German Democratic Republic" – "GDR", simply often "East Germany"), under control of the Socialist Unity Party. Neither country had a significant army until the 1950s, but East Germany built the Stasi into a powerful secret police that infiltrated every aspect of its society.

East Germany was an Eastern bloc state under political and military control of the Soviet Union through her occupation forces and the Warsaw Treaty. Political power was solely executed by leading members (Politburo) of the communist-controlled Socialist Unity Party (SED). A Soviet-style command economy was set up; later the GDR became the most advanced Comecon state. While East German propaganda was based on the benefits of the GDR's social programs and the alleged constant threat of a West German invasion, many of her citizens looked to the West for political freedoms and economic prosperity.

Walter Ulbricht (1893–1973) was the party boss from 1950 to 1971. In 1933, Ulbricht had fled to Moscow, where he served as a Comintern agent loyal to Stalin. As World War II was ending, Stalin assigned him the job of designing the postwar German system that would centralize all power in the Communist Party. Ulbricht became deputy prime minister in 1949 and secretary (chief executive) of the Socialist Unity (Communist) party in 1950. Some 2.6 million people had fled East Germany by 1961 when he built the Berlin Wall to stop them – shooting those who attempted it. What the GDR called the "Anti-Fascist Protective Wall" was a major embarrassment for the program during the Cold War, but it did stabilize East Germany and postpone its collapse. Ulbricht lost power in 1971, but was kept on as a nominal head of state. He was replaced because he failed to solve growing national crises, such as the worsening economy in 1969–70, the fear of another popular uprising as had occurred in 1953, and the disgruntlement between Moscow and Berlin caused by Ulbricht's détente policies toward the West.

The transition to Erich Honecker (General Secretary from 1971 to 1989) led to a change in the direction of national policy and efforts by the Politburo to pay closer attention to the grievances of the proletariat. Honecker's plans were not successful, however, with the dissent growing among East Germany's population.

In 1989, the socialist regime collapsed after 40 years, despite its omnipresent secret police, the Stasi. The main reasons for its collapse included severe economic problems and growing emigration towards the West.

East Germany's culture was shaped by Communism and particularly Stalinism. It was characterized by East German psychoanalyst Hans-Joachim Maaz in 1990 as having produced a "Congested Feeling" among Germans in the East as a result of Communist policies criminalizing personal expression that deviates from government approved ideals, and through the enforcement of Communist principals by physical force and intellectual repression by government agencies, particularly the Stasi. Critics of the East German state have claimed that the state's commitment to communism was a hollow and cynical tool of a ruling elite. This argument has been challenged by some scholars who claim that the Party was committed to the advance of scientific knowledge, economic development, and social progress. However, the vast majority regarded the state's Communist ideals to be nothing more than a deceptive method for government control.

According to German historian Jürgen Kocka (2010):
Conceptualizing the GDR as a dictatorship has become widely accepted, while the meaning of the concept dictatorship varies. Massive evidence has been collected that proves the repressive, undemocratic, illiberal, nonpluralistic character of the GDR regime and its ruling party.

West Germany (Bonn Republic)

In 1949, the three western occupation zones (American, British, and French) were combined into the Federal Republic of Germany (FRG, West Germany). The government was formed under Chancellor Konrad Adenauer and his conservative CDU/CSU coalition. The CDU/CSU was in power during most of the period since 1949. The capital was Bonn until it was moved to Berlin in 1990. In 1990, FRG absorbed East Germany and gained full sovereignty over Berlin. At all points West Germany was much larger and richer than East Germany, which became a dictatorship under the control of the Communist Party and was closely monitored by Moscow. Germany, especially Berlin, was a cockpit of the Cold War, with NATO and the Warsaw Pact assembling major military forces in west and east. However, there was never any combat.

Economic miracle

West Germany enjoyed prolonged economic growth beginning in the early 1950s (Wirtschaftswunder or "Economic Miracle"). Industrial production doubled from 1950 to 1957, and gross national product grew at a rate of 9 or 10% per year, providing the engine for economic growth of all of Western Europe. Labor unions supported the new policies with postponed wage increases, minimized strikes, support for technological modernization, and a policy of co-determination (Mitbestimmung), which involved a satisfactory grievance resolution system as well as requiring representation of workers on the boards of large corporations. The recovery was accelerated by the currency reform of June 1948, U.S. gifts of $1.4 billion as part of the Marshall Plan, the breaking down of old trade barriers and traditional practices, and the opening of the global market. West Germany gained legitimacy and respect, as it shed the horrible reputation Germany had gained under the Nazis.

West Germany played a central role in the creation of European cooperation; it joined NATO in 1955 and was a founding member of the European Economic Community in 1958.

Refugee settlements
To house the German-speakers expelled from all over Eastern Europe, quarters with cheap building were erected on the outskirts of all major and minor towns and villages of West Germany. Most often, these quarters are recognizable by the streets being named after towns of former Eastern Germany, Sudetenland, or other previously German-settled towns.

1948 currency reform 

The most dramatic and successful policy event was the currency reform of 1948. Since the 1930s, prices and wages had been controlled, but money had been plentiful. That meant that people had accumulated large paper assets, and that official prices and wages did not reflect reality, as the black market dominated the economy and more than half of all transactions were taking place unofficially. On 21 June 1948, the Western Allies withdrew the old currency and replaced it with the new Deutsche Mark at the rate of 1 new per 10 old. This wiped out 90% of government and private debt, as well as private savings. Prices were decontrolled, and labor unions agreed to accept a 15% wage increase, despite the 25% rise in prices. The result was that prices of German export products held steady, while profits and earnings from exports soared and were poured back into the economy. The currency reforms were simultaneous with the $1.4 billion in Marshall Plan money coming in from the United States, which was used primarily for investment.

In addition, the Marshall Plan forced German companies, as well as those in all of Western Europe, to modernize their business practices and take account of the international market. Marshall Plan funding helped overcome bottlenecks in the surging economy caused by remaining controls (which were removed in 1949), and Marshall Plan business reforms opened up a greatly expanded market for German exports. Overnight, consumer goods appeared in the stores, because they could be sold for realistic prices, emphasizing to Germans that their economy had turned a corner.

The success of the currency reform angered the Soviets, who cut off all road, rail, and canal links between the western zones and West Berlin. This was the Berlin Blockade, which lasted from 24 June 1948 to 12 May 1949. In response, the U.S. and Britain launched an airlift of food and coal and distributed the new currency in West Berlin as well. The city thereby became economically integrated into West Germany. Until the mid-1960s, it served as "America's Berlin", symbolizing the United States' commitment to defending its freedom, which John F. Kennedy underscored during his visit in June 1963.

Adenauer 

Konrad Adenauer (1876–1967) was the dominant leader in West Germany. He was the first chancellor (top official) of the FRG, 1949–63, and until his death was the founder and leader of the Christian Democratic Union (CDU), a coalition of conservatives, ordoliberals, and adherents of Protestant and Catholic social teaching that dominated West Germany politics for most of its history. During his chancellorship, the West Germany economy grew quickly, and West Germany established friendly relations with France, participated in the emerging European Union, established the country's armed forces (the Bundeswehr), and became a pillar of NATO as well as firm ally of the United States. Adenauer's government also commenced the long process of reconciliation with the Jews and Israel after the Holocaust.

Erhard 
Ludwig Erhard (1897–1977) was in charge of economic policy as economics director for the British and American occupation zones and was Adenauer's long-time economics minister. Erhard's decision to lift many price controls in 1948 (despite opposition from both the social democratic opposition and Allied authorities), plus his advocacy of free markets, helped set the Federal Republic on its strong growth from wartime devastation. Norbert Walter, a former chief economist at Deutsche Bank, argues that "Germany owes its rapid economic advance after World War II to the system of the Social Market Economy, established by Ludwig Erhard." Erhard was politically less successful when he served as the CDU Chancellor from 1963 until 1966. Erhard followed the concept of a social market economy, and was in close touch with professional economists. Erhard viewed the market itself as social and supported only a minimum of welfare legislation. However, Erhard suffered a series of decisive defeats in his effort to create a free, competitive economy in 1957; he had to compromise on such key issues as the anti-cartel legislation. Thereafter, the West German economy evolved into a conventional west European welfare state.

Meanwhile, in adopting the Godesberg Program in 1959, the Social Democratic Party of Germany (SPD) largely abandoned Marxism ideas and embraced the concept of the market economy and the welfare state. Instead it now sought to move beyond its old working class base to appeal the full spectrum of potential voters, including the middle class and professionals. Labor unions cooperated increasingly with industry, achieving labor representation on corporate boards and increases in wages and benefits.

Grand coalition 

In 1966, Erhard lost support and Kurt Kiesinger (1904–1988) was elected as Chancellor by a new CDU/CSU-SPD alliance combining the two largest parties. Social democratic (SPD) leader Willy Brandt was Deputy Federal Chancellor and Foreign Minister. The Grand Coalition lasted 1966–69 and is best known for reducing tensions with the Soviet bloc nations and establishing diplomatic relations with Czechoslovakia, Romania and Yugoslavia.

Guest workers 

With a booming economy short of unskilled workers, especially after the Berlin Wall cut off the steady flow of East Germans, the FRG negotiated migration agreements with Italy (1955), Spain (1960), Greece (1960), and Turkey (1961) that brought in hundreds of thousands of temporary guest workers, called Gastarbeiter. In 1968, the FRG signed a guest worker agreement with Yugoslavia that employed additional guest workers. Gastarbeiter were young men who were paid full-scale wages and benefits, but were expected to return home in a few years.

The agreement with Turkey ended in 1973 but few workers returned because there were few good jobs in Turkey. By 2010 there were about 4 million people of Turkish descent in Germany. The generation born in Germany attended German schools, but had a poor command of either German or Turkish, and had either low-skilled jobs or were unemployed.

Brandt and Ostpolitik 

Willy Brandt (1913–1992) was the leader of the Social Democratic Party in 1964–87 and West German Chancellor in 1969–1974. Under his leadership, the German government sought to reduce tensions with the Soviet Union and improve relations with the German Democratic Republic, a policy known as the Ostpolitik. Relations between the two German states had been icy at best, with propaganda barrages in each direction. The heavy outflow of talent from East Germany prompted the building of the Berlin Wall in 1961, which worsened Cold War tensions and prevented East Germans from travel. Although anxious to relieve serious hardships for divided families and to reduce friction, Brandt's Ostpolitik was intent on holding to its concept of "two German states in one German nation".

Ostpolitik was opposed by the conservative elements in Germany, but won Brandt an international reputation and the Nobel Peace Prize in 1971. In September 1973, both West and East Germany were admitted to the United Nations. The two countries exchanged permanent representatives in 1974, and, in 1987, East Germany's leader Erich Honecker paid an official state visit to West Germany.

Economic crisis of 1970s 

After 1973, Germany was hard hit by a worldwide economic crisis, soaring oil prices, and stubbornly high unemployment, which jumped from 300,000 in 1973 to 1.1 million in 1975. The Ruhr region was hardest hit, as its easy-to-reach coal mines petered out, and expensive German coal was no longer competitive. Likewise the Ruhr steel industry went into sharp decline, as its prices were undercut by lower-cost suppliers such as Japan. The welfare system provided a safety net for the large number of unemployed workers, and many factories reduced their labor force and began to concentrate on high-profit specialty items. After 1990 the Ruhr moved into service industries and high technology. Cleaning up the heavy air and water pollution became a major industry in its own right. Meanwhile, formerly rural Bavaria became a high-tech center of industry.

A spy scandal forced Brandt to step down as Chancellor while remaining as party leader. He was replaced by Helmut Schmidt (b. 1918), of the SPD, who served as Chancellor in 1974–1982. Schmidt continued the Ostpolitik with less enthusiasm. He had a PhD in economics and was more interested in domestic issues, such as reducing inflation. The debt grew rapidly as he borrowed to cover the cost of the ever more expensive welfare state. After 1979, foreign policy issues grew central as the Cold War turned hot again. The German peace movement mobilized hundreds of thousands of demonstrators to protest against American deployment in Europe of new medium-range ballistic missiles. Schmidt supported the deployment but was opposed by the left wing of the SPD and by Brandt.

The pro-business Free Democratic Party (FDP) had been in coalition with the SPD, but now it changed direction. Led by Finance Minister Otto Graf Lambsdorff (1926–2009) the FDP adopted the market-oriented "Kiel Theses" in 1977; it rejected the Keynesian emphasis on consumer demand, and proposed to reduce social welfare spending, and try to introduce policies to stimulate production and facilitate jobs. Lambsdorff argued that the result would be economic growth, which would itself solve both the social problems and the financial problems. As a consequence, the FDP switched allegiance to the CDU and Schmidt lost his parliamentary majority in 1982. For the only time in West Germany's history, the government fell on a vote of no confidence.

Kohl

Helmut Kohl (1930–2017) brought the conservatives back to power with a CDU/CSU-FDP coalition in 1982, and served as Chancellor until 1998. After repeated victories in 1983, 1987, 1990 and 1994 he was finally defeated by a landslide that was the biggest on record, for the left in the 1998 federal elections, and was succeeded as Chancellor by Gerhard Schröder of the SPD. Kohl is best known for orchestrating reunification with the approval of all the Four Powers from World War II, who still had a voice in German affairs.

Reunification

During the summer of 1989, rapid changes known as peaceful revolution or Die Wende took place in East Germany, which quickly led to German reunification. Growing numbers of East Germans emigrated to West Germany, many via Hungary after Hungary's reformist government opened its borders.

The opening of the Iron Curtain  betweenAustria and Hungary at the Pan-European Picnic in August 1989 then triggered a chain reaction, at the end of which there was no longer a GDR and the Eastern Bloc had disintegrated. Otto von Habsburg's idea developed the greatest mass exodus since the construction of the Berlin Wall and it was shown that the USSR and the rulers of the Eastern European satellite states were not ready to keep the Iron Curtain effective. This made their loss of power visible and clear that the GDR no longer received effective support from the other communist Eastern Bloc countries. Thousands of East Germans then tried to reach the West by staging sit-ins at West German diplomatic facilities in other East European capitals, most notably in Prague. The exodus generated demands within East Germany for political change, and mass demonstrations in several cities continued to grow.

Unable to stop the growing civil unrest, Erich Honecker was forced to resign in October, and on 9 November, East German authorities unexpectedly allowed East German citizens to enter West Berlin and West Germany. Hundreds of thousands of people took advantage of the opportunity; new crossing points were opened in the Berlin Wall and along the border with West Germany. This led to the acceleration of the process of reforms in East Germany that ended with the dissolution of East Germany and the German reunification that came into force on 3 October 1990.

Federal Republic of Germany, 1990–present

Schröder

The SPD in coalition with the Greens won the elections of 1998. SPD leader Gerhard Schröder positioned himself as a centrist "Third Way" candidate in the mold of British Prime Minister Tony Blair and United States President Bill Clinton.

Schröder, in March 2003, reversed his position and proposed a significant downsizing of the welfare state, known as Agenda 2010. He had enough support to overcome opposition from the trade unions and the SPD's left wing. Agenda 2010 had five goals: tax cuts; labor market deregulation, especially relaxing rules protecting workers from dismissal and setting up Hartz concept job training; modernizing the welfare state by reducing entitlements; decreasing bureaucratic obstacles for small businesses; and providing new low-interest loans to local governments.

On 26 December 2004 during a Christmas holiday and Boxing Day celebration, several thousand Germans in Thailand and other parts across the region of South and Southeast Asia were affected by the catastrophic tsunami from the magnitude 9.0 earthquake off the Indonesian island's west coast of Sumatra, and many thousands of German people died . A memorial service was held at Berlin Cathedral and Bundestag on 20 January 2005 on behalf of all Germans.

On 22 May 2005, after the SPD lost to the Christian Democratic Union (CDU) in North Rhine-Westphalia, Gerhard Schröder announced he would call federal elections "as soon as possible". A motion of confidence was subsequently defeated in the Bundestag on 1 July 2005 by 151 to 296 (with 148 abstaining), after Schröder urged members not to vote for his government in order to trigger new elections. In response, a grouping of left-wing SPD dissidents and the neo-communist Party of Democratic Socialism agreed to run on a joint ticket in the general election, with Schröder's rival Oskar Lafontaine leading the new group.

Merkel

In the 2005 elections, Angela Merkel became the first female chancellor. In 2009 the German government approved a €50 billion stimulus plan. Among the major German political projects of the early 21st century are the advancement of European integration, the energy transition for a sustainable energy supply, the debt brake for balanced budgets, measures to increase the fertility rate (pronatalism), and high-tech strategies for the transition of the German economy, summarised as Industry 4.0.
From 2005 to 2009 and 2013 to 2021, Germany was ruled by a grand coalition led by the CDU's Angela Merkel as chancellor. From 2009 to 2013, Merkel headed a centre-right government of the CDU/CSU and FDP.

Together with France and other EU states, Germany has played the leading role in the European Union. Germany (especially under Chancellor Helmut Kohl) was one of the main supporters of admitting many East European countries to the EU. Germany is at the forefront of European states seeking to exploit the momentum of monetary union to advance the creation of a more unified and capable European political, defence and security apparatus. German Chancellor Schröder expressed an interest in a permanent seat for Germany in the UN Security Council, identifying France, Russia, and Japan as countries that explicitly backed Germany's bid. Germany formally adopted the Euro on 1 January 1999 after permanently fixing the Deutsche Mark rate on 31 December 1998.

Since 1990, the German Bundeswehr has participated in a number of peacekeeping and disaster relief operations abroad. Since 2002, German troops formed part of the International Security Assistance Force in the war in Afghanistan, resulting in the first German casualties in combat missions since World War II.

In light of the worldwide Great Recession that began in 2008, Germany did not experience as much economic hardship as other European nations. Germany later sponsored a massive financial rescue in the wake of the Eurozone crisis which affected the German economy.

Following the 2011 earthquake and tsunami in Japan, which led to the Fukushima nuclear disaster, German public opinion turned sharply against nuclear power in Germany, which at the time produced a fourth of the electricity supply. In response Merkel announced plans to close down the nuclear power plants over the following decade, and a commitment to rely more heavily on wind and other alternative energy sources, in addition to coal and natural gas.

Germany was affected by the European migrant crisis in 2015 as it became the final destination of choice for many asylum seekers from Africa and the Middle East entering the EU. The country took in over a million refugees and migrants and developed a quota system which redistributed migrants around its federal states based on their tax income and existing population density. The decision by Merkel to authorize unrestricted entry led to heavy criticism in Germany as well as within Europe. This was a major factor in the rise of the far-right party Alternative for Germany which entered the Bundestag in the 2017 federal election.

The COVID-19 pandemic greatly affected German society with over 3 million confirmed cases and over 90,000 deaths. Following the first confirmed case in January 2020, the German government was commended for being an effective model for instituting methods of curbing infections and deaths, but lost this status by the end of the year due to a rising number of cases. Vaccines began to be administered in December 2020 and many restrictions were lifted by May 2021.

Scholz 

In September 2021 Germany's centre-left Social Democrats (SPD) narrowly won the federal election, ending 16 years of conservative-led rule under Angela Merkel.

On 8 December 2021,  Social Democrat Olaf Scholz was sworn in as Germany's new chancellor. He formed a coalition government with the Green Party and the liberal Free Democrats.

In February 2022, Frank-Walter Steinmeier was elected for a second five-year term as Germany's president. Although largely ceremonial post, he has been seen as a symbol of consensus and continuity.

After Russia's Feb. 24 invasion of Ukraine in 2022, Germany's previous foreign policy towards Russia (traditional Ostpolitik) has been severely criticized for having been too credulous and soft.

Historiography

Sonderweg debate

A major historiographical debate about the German history concerns the Sonderweg, the alleged "special path" that separated German history from the normal course of historical development, and whether or not Nazi Germany was the inevitable result of the Sonderweg. Proponents of the Sonderweg theory such as Fritz Fischer point to such events of the Revolution of 1848, the authoritarianism of the Second Empire and the continuation of the Imperial elite into the Weimar and Nazi periods. Opponents such as Gerhard Ritter of the Sonderweg theory argue that proponents of the theory are guilty of seeking selective examples, and there was much contingency and chance in German history. In addition, there was much debate within the supporters of the Sonderweg concept as for the reasons for the Sonderweg, and whether or not the Sonderweg ended in 1945. Was there a Sonderweg? Winkler says:
"For a long time, educated Germans answered it in the positive, initially by laying claim to a special German mission, then, after the collapse of 1945, by criticizing Germany's deviation from the West. Today, the negative view is predominant. Germany did not, according to the now prevailing opinion, differ from the great European nations to an extent that would justify speaking of a 'unique German path.' And, in any case, no country on earth ever took what can be described as the 'normal path.'"

See also

 Conservatism in Germany
 Liberalism in Germany
 Economic history of Germany
 History of Berlin
 History of German foreign policy
 History of German journalism
 History of the Jews in Germany
 History of women in Germany
 List of chancellors of Germany
 List of German monarchs
 Family tree of German monarchs
 Military history of Germany
 Names of Germany
 Politics of Germany
 Territorial evolution of Germany
 Timeline of German history

Notes

Citations

References

Encyclopedia

Journals

Atlas and maps
 Atlas of Germany Wikipedia maps; not copyright

Further reading

Surveys
 Biesinger, Joseph A. Germany: A reference guide from the Renaissance to the present (2006)
 Bithell, Jethro, ed. Germany: A Companion to German Studies (5th ed. 1955), 578pp; essays on German literature, music, philosophy, art and, especially, history. 
 Bösch, Frank. Mass Media and Historical Change: Germany in International Perspective, 1400 to the Present (Berghahn, 2015). 212 pp. online review
 Buse, Dieter K. ed. Modern Germany: An Encyclopedia of History, People, and Culture 1871–1990 (2 vol 1998)
 Detwiler, Donald S. Germany: A Short History (3rd ed. 1999) 341pp.
  This text has updated editions.
 Gall, Lothar. Milestones - Setbacks - Sidetracks: The Path to Parliamentary Democracy in Germany, Historical Exhibition in the Deutscher Dom in Berlin (2003), exhibit catalog; heavily illustrated, 420pp; political history since 1800
 Herbert, Ulrich. A History of Twentieth-Century Germany (2019) excerpt
 Holborn, Hajo. A History of Modern Germany (1959–64); vol 1: The Reformation; vol 2: 1648–1840; vol 3: 1840–1945; standard scholarly survey online
 Kitchen, Martin. A history of modern Germany, 1800–2000 (2006) online
 Maehl, William Harvey. Germany in Western Civilization (1979), 833pp; focus on politics and diplomacy
 Orlow, Dietrich. A history of modern Germany : 1871 to present (2002) online
 Ozment, Steven. A Mighty Fortress: A New History of the German People (2005), focus on cultural history
 Raff, Diether. History of Germany from the Medieval Empire to the Present (1988) 507pp
 Reinhardt, Kurt F. Germany: 2000 Years (2 vols., 1961), stress on cultural topics
 Richie, Alexandra. Faust's Metropolis: A History of Berlin (1998), 1168 pp by scholar; excerpt and text search; emphasis on 20th century
 Sagarra, Eda. A Social History of Germany 1648–1914 (1977, 2002 edition)
 Schulze, Hagen, and Deborah Lucas Schneider. Germany: A New History (2001)
  Smith, Helmut Walser, ed. The Oxford Handbook of Modern German History (2011), 862 pp; 35 essays by specialists; Germany since 1760
  608pp.
 Snyder, Louis, ed. Documents of German history (1958) online. 620pp; 167 primary sources in English translation
 Taylor, A.J.P. The Course of German History: A Survey of the Development of German History since 1815. (2001). 280pp; 
 Watson, Peter. The German Genius (2010). 992 pp covers many thinkers, writers, scientists etc. since 1750; 
 Winkler, Heinrich August. Germany: The Long Road West (2 vol, 2006), since 1789;  excerpt and text search vol 1
 Zabecki, David T., ed. Germany at War: 400 Years of Military History (4 vol. 2015)

Medieval
 Arnold, Benjamin. Medieval Germany, 500–1300: A Political Interpretation (1998)
 Arnold, Benjamin. Power and Property in Medieval Germany: Economic and Social Change, c. 900–1300 (Oxford University Press, 2004) 
 Barraclough, Geoffrey. The Origins of Modern Germany (2d ed., 1947)
 Fuhrmann, Horst. Germany in the High Middle Ages: c. 1050–1200 (1986)
 
 Haverkamp, Alfred, Helga Braun, and Richard Mortimer. Medieval Germany 1056–1273 (1992)
 Innes; Matthew. State and Society in the Early Middle Ages: The Middle Rhine Valley, 400–1000 (Cambridge U.P. 2000) 
 Jeep, John M. Medieval Germany: An Encyclopedia (2001), 928pp, 650 articles by 200 scholars cover AD 500 to 1500
 Nicholas, David. The Northern Lands: Germanic Europe, c. 1270–c. 1500 (Wiley-Blackwell, 2009). 410 pages.
 Reuter, Timothy. Germany in the Early Middle Ages, c. 800–1056 (1991)

Reformation
 Bainton, Roland H. Here I Stand: A Life of Martin Luther (1978; reprinted 1995)
 Dickens, A. G. Martin Luther and the Reformation (1969), basic introduction
 Holborn, Hajo. A History of Modern Germany: vol 1: The Reformation (1959)
 Junghans, Helmar. Martin Luther: Exploring His Life and Times, 1483–1546. (book plus CD ROM) (1998)
 MacCulloch, Diarmaid. The Reformation (2005), influential recent survey
 Ranke, Leopold von. History of the Reformation in Germany (1905) 792 pp; by Germany's foremost scholar complete text online free
 Smith, Preserved. The Age of the Reformation (1920) 861 pages; complete text online free

Early Modern to 1815
 Asprey, Robert B. Frederick the Great: The Magnificent Enigma (2007)
 Atkinson, C.T. A history of Germany, 1715–1815 (1908) old; focus on political-military-diplomatic history of Germany and Austria online edition
 Blanning, Tim. Frederick the Great: King of Prussia (2016), major new scholarly biography
 Bruford W.H. Germany in the Eighteenth Century The Social Background of the Literary Revival (1935, 1971) online free to borrow, covers social history
 Gagliardo, John G. Germany under the Old Regime 1600–1790 (1991) excerpt
 Gaxotte, Pierre. Frederick the Great (Yale University Press, 1942); 420 pages; political biography by French historian 
 Heal, Bridget. The Cult of the Virgin Mary in Early Modern Germany: Protestant and Catholic Piety, 1500–1648 (2007)
 Holborn, Hajo. A History of Modern Germany. Vol 2: 1648–1840 (1962) online
 Hughes, Michael. Early Modern Germany, 1477–1806 (1992)
 Ogilvie, Sheilagh. Germany: A New Social and Economic History, Vol. 1: 1450–1630 (1995) 416pp; Germany: A New Social and Economic History, Vol. 2: 1630–1800 (1996), 448pp
 Ogilvie, Sheilagh. A Bitter Living: Women, Markets, and Social Capital in Early Modern Germany (2003) DOI:10.1093/acprof:oso/9780198205548.001.0001 online
 Ozment, Steven. Flesh and Spirit: Private Life in Early Modern Germany (2001).
 Schulze, Hagen. The Course of German Nationalism: From Frederick the Great to Bismarck 1763–1867 (1991)
 Storring, Adam L. "'Our Age': Frederick the Great, Classical Warfare, and the Uses and Abuses of Military History." International Journal of Military History and Historiography 1.aop (2021): 1–33.online

1815–1890
 Blackbourn, David. The Long Nineteenth Century: A History of Germany, 1780–1918 (1998)  excerpt and text search
 Blackbourn, David, and Geoff Eley. The Peculiarities of German History: Bourgeois Society and Politics in Nineteenth-Century Germany (1984)
 Brandenburg, Erich. From Bismarck to the World War: A History of German Foreign Policy 1870–1914 (1933)  562pp; an old standard scholarly history
 Brose, Eric Dorn. German History, 1789–1871: From the Holy Roman Empire to the Bismarckian Reich. (1997)
 Craig, Gordon A. Germany, 1866–1945 (1978) online
 Hamerow, Theodore S. ed. Age of Bismarck: Documents and Interpretations (1974), 358pp; 133 excerpts from primary sources put in historical context by Professor Hamerow
 Hamerow, Theodore S. ed. Otto Von Bismarck and Imperial Germany: A Historical Assessment (1993), excerpts from historians and primary sources
 Hoyer, Katja. Blood and Iron: The Rise and Fall of the German Empire 1871–1918 (2021)
 Ogilvie, Sheilagh, and Richard Overy. Germany: A New Social and Economic History Volume 3: Since 1800 (2004)
 Pflanze Otto, ed. The Unification of Germany, 1848–1871 (1979), essays by historians
 Ramm, Agatha. Germany, 1789–1919: a political history (1967) online free to borrow
 Sheehan, James J. German History, 1770–1866 (1993), the major survey in English online
 Steinberg, Jonathan. Bismarck: A Life (2011), a major scholarly biography
 Stern, Fritz. Gold and Iron: Bismark, Bleichroder, and the Building of the German Empire (1979) Bismark worked closely with this leading banker and financier excerpt and text search
  online
 Wehler, Hans-Ulrich. The German Empire 1871–1918 (1984)

1890–1933
 Balfour, Michael. The Kaiser and his Times (1972) online
 Berghahn, Volker Rolf. Modern Germany: society, economy, and politics in the twentieth century (1987) ACLS E-book
 Berghahn, Volker Rolf. Imperial Germany, 1871–1914: Economy, Society, Culture, and Politics (2nd ed. 2005)
 Brandenburg, Erich. From Bismarck to the World War: A History of German Foreign Policy 1870–1914 (1927) online.
 Cecil, Lamar. Wilhelm II: Prince and Emperor, 1859–1900 (1989)  vol2: Wilhelm II: Emperor and Exile, 1900–1941 (1996) 
 Child, John. Edexcel GCSE History A : the making of the modern world : Unit 2A, Germany 1918–39 : student book (2009) online
 Craig, Gordon A. Germany, 1866–1945 (1978) online
 Dugdale, E.T.S. ed.  German Diplomatic Documents 1871–1914  (4 vol 1928–31), in English translation. online
 Gordon, Peter E., and John P. McCormick, eds. Weimar Thought: A Contested Legacy (Princeton U.P. 2013) 451 pages; scholarly essays on law, culture, politics, philosophy, science, art and architecture
 Herbert, Ulrich. A History of Twentieth-Century Germany (2019) excerpt
 Herwig, Holger H. The First World War: Germany and Austria–Hungary 1914–1918 (1996), 
 Kolb, Eberhard. The Weimar Republic (2005)
 Mommsen, Wolfgang J. Imperial Germany 1867–1918: Politics, Culture and Society in an Authoritarian State (1995)
 Morrow, Ian F. D. "The Foreign Policy of Prince Von Bulow, 1898–1909". Cambridge Historical Journal 4#1 (1932): 63–93. online
 Peukert, Detlev. The Weimar Republic (1993)
 Retallack, James. Imperial Germany, 1871–1918 (Oxford University Press, 2008)
 Scheck, Raffael. "Lecture Notes, Germany and Europe, 1871–1945" (2008) full text online, a brief textbook by a leading scholar
 Stolper, Gustav. German Economy, 1870–1940: Issues and Trends (Routledge, 2017).
 Watson, Alexander. Ring of Steel: Germany and Austria-Hungary in World War I (2014),  excerpt

Nazi era
 Bullock, Alan. Hitler: A Study in Tyranny,  (1962) online
 Burleigh, Michael. The Third Reich: A New History. (2000). 864 pp. Stress on antisemitism;
 Evans, Richard J. The Coming of the Third Reich: A History. (2004) [2003]. 622 pp.; a major scholarly survey; The Third Reich in Power: 1933–1939. (2005). 800 pp.; The Third Reich at War 1939–1945 (2009) vol 1-2-3 online
 Friedlander, Saul. Nazi Germany and the Jews, 1933–1945 (2009) abridged version of the standard two volume history
 Herbert, Ulrich. A History of Twentieth-Century Germany (2019) excerpt
 Kershaw, Ian. Hitler, 1889–1936: Hubris. vol. 1. 1999. 700 pp. ; vol 2: Hitler, 1936–1945: Nemesis. 2000. 832 pp.; the leading scholarly biography.
 Kirk, Tim. The Longman Companion to Nazi Germany (2017).
 Koonz, Claudia. Mothers in the Fatherland: Women, Family Life, and Nazi Ideology, 1919–1945. (1986). 640 pp. The major study
 Overy, Richard. The Dictators: Hitler's Germany and Stalin's Russia (2004); comparative history
 Spielvogel, Jackson J. and David Redles. Hitler and Nazi Germany (6th ed. 2009)  excerpt and text search, 5th ed. 2004
 Stackelberg, Roderick.  Hitler's Germany: Origins, Interpretations, Legacies (1999)
 Stackelberg, Roderick, ed.  The Routledge Companion to Nazi Germany (2007)
 Stibbe, Matthew. Women in the Third Reich, (2003), 208 pp.
 Tooze, Adam. The Wages of Destruction: The Making and Breaking of the Nazi Economy (2007), highly influential new study; online review by Richard Tilly; summary of reviews
 Thomsett, Michael C. The German Opposition to Hitler: The Resistance, the Underground, and Assassination Plots, 1938–1945 (2nd ed 2007) 278 pages
 Zentner, Christian and Bedürftig, Friedemann, eds. The Encyclopedia of the Third Reich. (2 vol. 1991). 1120 pp.

Since 1945
 Bark, Dennis L., and David R. Gress. A History of West Germany Vol 1: From Shadow to Substance, 1945–1963 (1992); ; vol 2: Democracy and Its Discontents 1963–1988 (1992) 
 Berghahn, Volker Rolf. Modern Germany: Society, Economy, and Politics in the Twentieth Century (1987) ACLS E-book online
 Daum, Andreas. Kennedy in Berlin. New York: Cambridge University Press, 2008, .
 Gehler, Michael. Three Germanies: West Germany, East Germany and the Berlin Republic (Reaktion Books, 2013).
 Hanrieder, Wolfram F. Germany, America, Europe: Forty Years of German Foreign Policy (1989) 
 Herbert, Ulrich. A History of Twentieth-Century Germany (2019) excerpt
 Jähner, Harald. Aftermath: Life in the Fallout of the Third Reich, 1945-1955 (2022) excerpt

 Jarausch, Konrad H. After Hitler: Recivilizing Germans, 1945–1995 (2008)
 Junker, Detlef, ed. The United States and Germany in the Era of the Cold War (2 vol 2004), 150 short essays by scholars covering 1945–1990 excerpt and text search vol 1;  excerpt and text search vol 2
 Main, Steven J. "The Soviet Occupation of Germany. Hunger, Mass Violence and the Struggle for Peace, 1945–1947". Europe-Asia Studies (2014) 66#8 pp: 1380–1382.
 Schwarz, Hans-Peter. Konrad Adenauer: A German Politician and Statesman in a Period of War, Revolution and Reconstruction (2 vol 1995) excerpt and text search vol 2
 Smith, Gordon, ed, Developments in German Politics (1992) , broad survey of reunified nation
 Weber, Jurgen. Germany, 1945–1990 (Central European University Press, 2004)

Primary sources 
 Beate Ruhm Von Oppen, ed. Documents on Germany under Occupation, 1945–1954 (Oxford University Press, 1955)

GDR
 Dennis, Mike, and Norman LaPorte. State and Minorities in Communist East Germany (Berghahn Books, 2011) scholarly analysis of treatment of Jehovah's Witnesses, Jews, guest workers from Vietnam and Mozambique, football fans and others.
 Fulbrook, Mary. Anatomy of a Dictatorship: Inside the GDR, 1949–1989 (1998)
 Fulbrook, Mary. The People's State: East German Society from Hitler to Honecker (2008) excerpt and text search
 Harsch, Donna. Revenge of the Domestic: Women, the Family, and Communism in the German Democratic Republic (2008)
 Jarausch, Konrad H.. and Eve Duffy. Dictatorship As Experience: Towards a Socio-Cultural History of the GDR (1999)
 Jarausch, Konrad H., and Volker Gransow, eds. Uniting Germany: Documents and Debates, 1944–1993 (1994), primary sources on reunification
 McAdams, A. James. "Germany Divided: From the Wall to Reunification". Princeton University Press, 1992 and 1993.
 Pence, Katherine, and Paul Betts, eds. Socialist Modern: East German Everyday Culture and Politics (2008) excerpt and text search
 Pritchard, Gareth. The Making of the GDR, 1945–53 (2004)
 Ross, Corey. The East German Dictatorship: Problems and Perspectives in the Interpretation of the GDR (2002)
 Saxonberg, Steven. The fall: A comparative study of the end of Communism in Czechoslovakia, East Germany, Hungary and Poland (Routledge, 2013).
 Steiner, André. The Plans That Failed: An Economic History of East Germany, 1945–1989 (2010)

Historiography
 Berghahn, Volker R., and Simone Lassig, eds. Biography between Structure and Agency: Central European Lives in International Historiography (2008)
 Chickering, Roger, ed. Imperial Germany: A Historiographical Companion (1996), 552pp; 18 essays by specialists;
 Evans, Richard J. Rereading German History: From Unification to Reunification, 1800–1996 (1997)
 Hagemann, Karen, and Jean H. Quataert, eds. Gendering Modern German History: Rewriting Historiography (2008)
 
 Hagen, William W. German History in Modern Times: Four Lives of the Nation (2012) excerpt
 Jarausch, Konrad H., and Michael Geyer, eds. Shattered Past: Reconstructing German Histories (2003)
 Klessmann, Christoph. The Divided Past: Rewriting Post-War German History (2001)
 Lehmann, Hartmut, and James Van Horn Melton, eds. Paths of Continuity: Central European Historiography from the 1930s to the 1950s (2003)
 Perkins, J. A. "Dualism in German Agrarian Historiography, Comparative Studies in Society and History, Apr 1986, Vol. 28 Issue 2, pp 287–330,
 Rüger, Jan, and Nikolaus Wachsmann, eds. Rewriting German history: New Perspectives on Modern Germany (Palgrave Macmillan, 2015).
 Stuchtey, Benedikt, and Peter Wende, eds. British and German Historiography, 1750–1950: Traditions, Perceptions, and Transfers (2000)

 
Articles containing video clips